= Path to Paradise: The Untold Story of the World Trade Center Bombing =

1997 American television film

- A poster for the film
- Genre: Docudrama
- Screenplay by: Ned Curren
- Directed by: Leslie Libman; Larry Williams
- Starring: Peter Gallagher
- Theme music composer: Mitchell Froom
- Country of origin: United States
- Original language: English

Production
- Producer: Amy Kaufman
- Cinematography: Jean de Segonzac
- Editor: Cindy Mollo
- Running time: 91 minutes
- Production company: HBO NYC Productions

Original release
- Network: HBO
- Release: June 14, 1997

Path to Paradise: The Untold Story of the World Trade Center Bombing is a 1997 American television film that depicts the events surrounding the 1993 World Trade Center bombing. The film was directed by Larry Williams and Leslie Libman. It stars Peter Gallagher and Marcia Gay Harden, and features Andreas Katsulas as Omar Abdel-Rahman and Art Malik as Ramzi Yousef. The film premiered on HBO in June 1997.

== Plot ==
The movie begins with Agent John Anticev, discussing terrorist training tapes. Then, a New Jersey cop pulls over a car and interrogates El Sayyid Nosair (city worker). Nosair claims that he runs a car dealership, and the cop lets him go. Then we are introduced to other the plotters in the car: Rodney Hampton-El (hospital worker), Ibrahim El-Gabrowy (contractor), Mohammed Salameh (delivery man), and Mahmud Abouhalima (limo driver).

Emad Salem then introduces himself to the FBI as an informant. The FBI was reluctant to aid Salem's efforts despite having credibility as an intelligence officer. Salem reported to Agent Nancy Floyd of the photos of the men and also requested a salary of $500 per week.

On September 1, 1992, Razmi Yousef (mastermind and bomb builder) and Ahmad Ajaj (pizza delivery man) arrived in America. Ajaj had trouble with verification; while Yousef lacked a visa and requested political asylum. As both men are interrogated by inspectors, Yousef has multiple IDs; it was a red flag. Yousef's inspector wanted to verify him through a judge. However, the cells were full of asylum seekers, resulting in Yousef being freed. However, in Ajaj's interrogation, the inspector found diagrams of a bomb.

Later on, Ramzi rents an abandoned house as Salameh pays rent to a storage facility. Yousef then buys some of the chemicals he needs for the plot. Nidal Ayyad (chemical engineer) helped with the plot by ordering the remaining chemical ingredients for the bomb. While Salameh and Yousef were transporting the ingredients, they got into a car accident and Ramzi was hospitalized.

On February 25, 1993, Salameh and Yousef both bought a Ryder van for the plot. As they went inside the storage facility, the chemicals they ordered have arrived. However, the Manager of the storage facility saw it and states it violates the storage facility rules; no chemicals are permitted on the site. Yousef calms the situation by stating a van will pick the chemicals up. Later that night, all the chemicals got assembled and the bomb was placed inside the van.

The next day, Yousef drove the van down the basement beneath the World Trade Center. A group of workers were conversing on their lunch break. Unaware of the danger, Yousef then enacts his plan; he lit the fuse and ran away as fast as possible. The clock ticks down to the eventual explosion. Two people died, while a hundred were injured. However, the plan failed as the towers remained standing.

Back at headquarters, the agency worked around the clock to find out the identity of the perpetrators. Meanwhile, Salameh goes back to Pathmark Plaza try to reimburse money for the Ryder van by claim the van was "stolen". However, there was no receipt, thus the clerk couldn't make the refund. The next day, Salameh tried again to reimburse his deposit. However, the man was covertly a federal agent, wiretapping the conversation. Salameh negotiates to get his money with some difficulty. Eventually, he got his money, only to be apprehended the moment he left the store.

In May 1993, Salem uses a briefcase as a tape recorder on the remaining plotters. Rodney then reveals that they use code names for their targets. Salem then goes to hang out with (The Sheikh) Omar Abdel-Rahman on what the next targets will be, the Sheikh responds it would not be the United Nations; when pressed about more potential targets, Omar refused to elaborate.

Several more arrests have been made, and Yousef was now bountied. Lou Napoli then questioned about Salem with his investigations. Salem is then seen recording Hampton, talking about their plans of blowing up the Holland Tunnel and various targets. Eventually, the whole conspiracy fell apart as the FBI gathered enough evidence to charge and arrest them for their crimes. In November 1995, the terrorists were all tried and got various life sentences. Salem received a million dollars and was placed in a witness protection program. As Yousef is arrested and extradited to the United States, he vows to "bring them both down".

== Cast ==
- Peter Gallagher as John Anticev
- Art Malik as Ramzi Yousef
- Ned Eisenberg as Emad Salem
- Marcia Gay Harden as Nancy Floyd
- Paul Guilfoyle as Lou Napoli
- Andreas Katsulas as Omar Abdel-Rahman
- Keith Randolph Smith as Ray Williams
- Sheik Mahmud-Bey as Rodney Hampton-El
- Shaun Toub as El Sayyid Nosair
- Mike Starr as Mahmud Abouhalima
- Jeffrey DeMunn as Robert Brokaw
- Allison Janney as Assistant District Attorney
- Mike O'Malley as Storage Facility Manager
- Peter McRobbie as Male Attorney

== Production ==
Filming occurred New Jersey and Manhattan.

== Controversy ==
Upon its release, the film attracted criticism for how it depicted Arabs and Muslims. A 1997 report by the American-Arab Anti-Discrimination Committee states, "[Path to Paradise] left viewers with the distinct impression that Arabs and Muslims in general are violent terrorists who will continue to attack Americans. One of the film's clear messages was that Arab immigrants are a threat to the United States and are likely to support acts of terrorism [...] Not once did the film suggest that the overwhelming majority of Arabs and Muslims in the United States condemned the bombing and feared the backlash that it might cause on their communities."

It was scheduled for a repeat broadcast on HBO the week of the 9/11 attacks. HBO pulled it from its schedule following the attacks.

== See also ==
- Without Warning: Terror in the Towers – 1993 television movie
