= Without Warning: Terror in the Towers =

1993 television movie

- Genre: Drama
- Screenplay by: Stephen Downing; Duane Poole
- Directed by: Alan J. Levi
- Starring: George Clooney; Andre Braugher; Fran Drescher; James Avery
- Country of origin: United States
- Original language: English

Production
- Producers: Charles Melniker; Madelon Rosenfeld
- Cinematography: Chuy Elizondo
- Running time: 98 minutes
- Production company: Wilshire Court Productions

Original release
- Network: NBC
- Release: May 26, 1993

Without Warning: Terror in the Towers is a 1993 American made-for-television drama directed by Alan J. Levi and starring George Clooney, Andre Braugher and Fran Drescher.

The film chronicles the events surrounding the 1993 World Trade Center bombing in New York, in which terrorists drove an explosives laden van into the public parking garage beneath the complex and detonated it. Six people were killed and over 1,000 were injured. The film aired just four months after the terrorist attack took place.

== Plot ==
The movie tells the story of the day through a series of vignettes, recounting the experience of people who were in the building when the bomb exploded and their efforts to escape safely. Fran Drescher and Susan Ruttan portray teachers who've brought their elementary school classes on a field trip to the twin towers. One group gets stuck on an elevator while another must climb onto the roof to escape. George Clooney is a fireman who gets injured when he falls into a fiery basement. James Avery plays a maintenance worker who braves the wreckage looking for his friend. Andre Braugher leads the bomb squad, tasked with uncovering who brought the bomb into the building. Robin Thomas plays an office worker who must help a disabled co-worker down 87 flights of stairs.

== Cast ==
- James Avery as Fred Ferby
- Andre Braugher as Tag
- George Clooney as Kevin Shea
- Fran Drescher as Rosemarie Russo
- John Karlen as Jack McAllister
- Scott Plank as Gary Geidel
- Susan Ruttan as Anne Marie Tesoriero
- Michael Stoyanov as Rob Daddio
- Robin Thomas as Jack
- Charles Bernard as Guard #1
- Conrad Dunn as Mohammed A. Salameh
- Barbara Kite as Anita's Mother

== Reception ==
Despite a star-studded cast, the film received mixed reviews. The New York Times cited it as an example of "instant docudramas" aiming to capitalize on viewers' interest in current events, complaining that the "unsettling realities were smothered by a torrent of mush." Variety praised the film's use of original news footage to develop the sense of reality, but said the film "serves up formula adventure sure to draw folks who like eyeballing a car wreck."

== See also ==
- Path to Paradise: The Untold Story of the World Trade Center Bombing
