= Zak Ebrahim =

American peace campaigner and author (born 1983)

- زاك إبراهيم
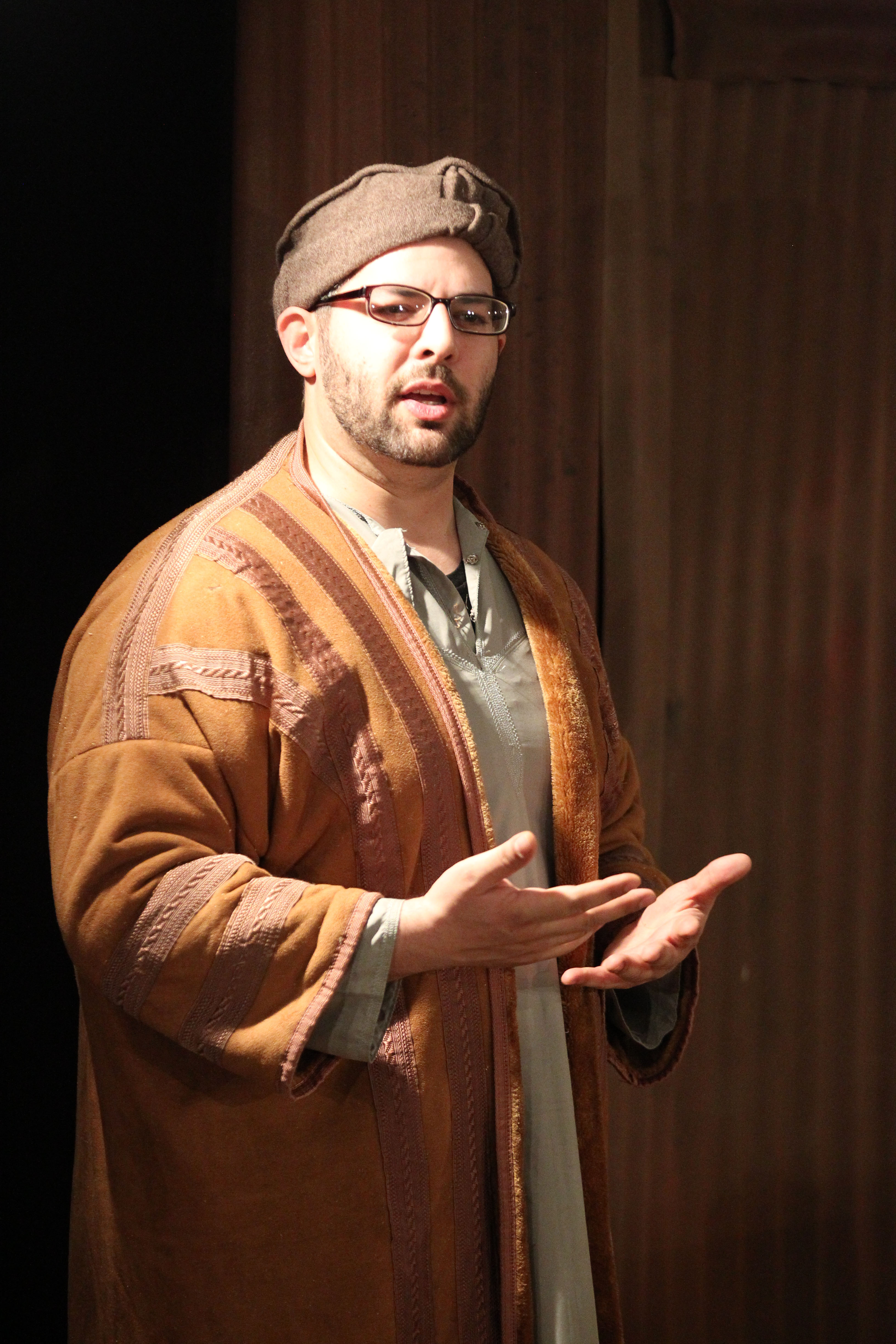
- Born: Abdulaziz El Sayyid Nosair; March 24, 1983 (age 43); Pittsburgh, Pennsylvania, U.S.
- Occupations: Peace campaigner, author
- Father: El Sayyid Nosair

Zak Ebrahim (born Abdulaziz El Sayyid Nosair (Arabic: عبد العزيز السيد نصير); March 24, 1983 in Pittsburgh, Pennsylvania) is an American peace campaigner and author. He is the son of El Sayyid Nosair, who assassinated Meir Kahane, the founder of the Jewish Defense League and a militant Orthodox rabbi. Nosair was later convicted of involvement in the New York City landmark bomb plot.

After several years of hiding his true identity, Abdulaziz changed his name to Zak Ebrahim and began to speak publicly about his father's activities and in favor of peace. He released his first book, The Terrorist's Son: A Story of Choice through Simon & Schuster in September 2014. It won an American Library Association award in 2015.

== Other family ==
Ebrahim's mother, a native of Pittsburgh born Karen Mills, changed her name to Khadijah, when she left Roman Catholicism for Islam, in 1982. He has a brother, as well as a half-sister from his mother's previous marriage.

== Works ==
- Ebrahim, Zak; Giles, Jeff (September 9, 2014). The Terrorist's Son. Simon & Schuster/ TED. ISBN 978-1476784809. Archived from the original on December 27, 2014.
