= Källström =

Källström is a Swedish surname, simplified Kallstrom. Notable people with the surname include:

- Kim Källström (born 1982), Swedish footballer
- Harry Källström (1939–2009), Swedish professional rally driver
- James Kallstrom (1943–2021), American Federal Bureau of Investigation (FBI) agent

== See also ==
- Marjo Matikainen-Kallström (born 1965), former Finnish cross-country skier
