= 1993 New York City landmark bomb plot =

Foiled terror plot in New York City

- Location: New York City, New York
- Date: 1993
- Target: Egypt President Hosni Mubarak; US Senator Al D'Amato; United Nations headquarters George Washington Bridge; St. Regis; Millennium UN Plaza; Jacob K. Javits Federal Building
- Attack type: Planned assassination, bombing, terrorist attack
- Perpetrators: Omar Abdel-Rahman, Siddig Ali, and 8 co-conspirators
- Motive: Support of Israel and secular Arab governments

The 1993 New York City landmark bomb plot was a planned attack on well-known landmark targets throughout New York City, with one goal of causing a distraction that would create an opportunity to assassinate the Egyptian President Hosni Mubarak. The attack was foiled by the Federal Bureau of Investigation before it could be carried out.

The Federal Bureau of Investigation had a confidential informant, Emad Salem, infiltrate the group of plotters. Federal officers arrested the main suspects in June 1993, and in 1995, ten defendants, including Omar Abdel-Rahman were convicted of 48 charges related to the plot.

== Planned attacks ==
The conspirators planned to assassinate Mubarak in a "suicide mission" during an April visit to the United Nations headquarters in New York City. Mubarak arrived in the United States on April 4, 1993, but did not travel to New York City. The plotters believed they had an informant inside their group who leaked their plans, but in reality the FBI did not have their informant in place until late June.

The group decided to try again in September 1993 during the opening of the General Assembly of the United Nations. They intended to infiltrate hotels by masquerading as employees to get close to Mubarak. The other attacks in the city were used as distractions and to inflict chaos throughout the city. Bombs would be used on the bridge and tunnels while the other terrorists would raid the hotels with guns.

The six targets to be attacked were the UN headquarters, the Lincoln Tunnel, the Holland Tunnel, the George Washington Bridge, the St. Regis and the UN Plaza hotels, and the FBI's main New York office at the Jacob K. Javits Federal Building. The plotters also discussed planting a total of 12 bombs around the city targeting Jews and Jewish organization that would be detonated simultaneously.

The group also planned to assassinate US Senator Al D'Amato and Egyptian President Hosni Mubarak. Nosair also proposed other targets, including New York State Assemblyman Dov Hikind, a Jewish politician, and Alvin Schlesinger, a judge who had tried him in a previous case.

The hotels were known to host prestigious guests such as the US ambassador to the United Nations and the US secretary of state, who stayed at the Waldorf during UN sessions. The hotels are also known to host several prominent business leaders. Attacking the locations would thus create chaos in the financial and diplomatic aspects of New York.

The planned attacks on the Holland and Lincoln tunnels and the George Washington Bridge would create transportation chaos, as these were the only three direct vehicular crossings of the Hudson River between New Jersey and Manhattan. If the attacks were successful, police, civilians, and other respondents would have faced major challenges entering and leaving the city to and from New Jersey. Co-conspirators indicated that they intended to drive bomb-laden cars into the tunnels, stall the cars in the middle, and detonate them three minutes after leaving the cars.

In tape-recorded conversations, the attackers also discussed attacks on the Diamond District in Manhattan, an area heavily represented by Jewish businesspeople who participate in a local one-block industry that accounted for 95% of the diamonds imported into the country. The plotter said that attacking the neighborhood would be similar to "hitting Israel itself."

== Investigation ==
=== FBI surveillance ===
The FBI had been closely monitoring the plan throughout 1992 and 1993 but intensified its investigation after the World Trade Center bombing in February 1993, which killed six people. The FBI obtained warrants to listen to phone calls to and from Abdel-Rahmen's Sudanese driver, a confidential informant.

Emad Salem, a former Egyptian army officer was an informant who was recruited to infiltrate the close circle of Abdel-Rahman. Around May 7, 1993, Salem started meeting regularly with the defendants. He recorded 150 hours of conversations over five months.

The FBI had also been monitoring the plotters through video surveillance hidden in their safe house, where bombs were being developed. Combined, the video surveillance and the use of an inside man greatly contributed into foiling the plot. In the final weeks of the investigation, the FBI monitored the plot almost constantly. At one point, when Senator D'Amato and Assemblyman Hikind received bodyguards, agents mistakenly feared that their investigation had been exposed.

=== Arrests ===
On June 16, 1993, Egyptian immigrant Abdo Mohammed Haggag was charged for conspiring to assassinate Mubarak. Eight conspirators were arrested in raids on June 24, 1993, after Salem had observed the group for five months. Five of those arrested on June 24 were mixing chemicals for the bombs when they were arrested. It was revealed that the conspirators had also conducted test bombings before the World Trade Center bombing. They had also made preparations for a quick escape, which led the FBI to conclude that the suspects needed to be arrested quickly. A ninth suspect was arrested on June 30. When Nosair was arrested, a search of his apartment revealed "formulas for the construction of bombs" as well as video and audio tapes advocating the destruction of tall buildings.

Abdel-Rahman turned himself into the police on July 2.

The government announced the indictment of a tenth suspect on July 8. After the arrests were made, the Port Authority of New York and New Jersey increased security on its six river crossings between New York and New Jersey, which included the three crossings targeted in the bombing plot.

=== Trials ===
The government sought RICO charges including the 1993 planned assassinations and landmark bombings, as well as the 1990 assassination of Meir Kahane. Using this strategy, the government would not need to prove that Abdel-Rahman directly ordered his followers to blow up any targets, and would also get a second chance to prosecute Nosair, this time with federal charges to avoid double jeopardy. The prosecution maintained that the 1993 World Trade Center bombing was also part of the conspiracy, but neither Abdel-Rahman nor any co-defendants were formally accused of any role in that attack.

William Kunstler agreed to represent three of the suspects, including Abdel-Rahman and Nosair. However, Federal Judge Michael Mukasey later ruled that Abdel-Rahman and the two other suspects would have to be represented separately and that Kunstler and Ronald L. Kuby would have to choose which defendants to represent. Abdel-Rahman later offered to represent himself after the two lawyers could not agree on who would represent him. A bail hearing for one of the suspects, Clement Rodney Hampton-El, was held at the United States District Court for the Southern District of New York on July 8. The court found that Salem's tapes supported only some of the charges against Hampton-El. The federal government wanted to try the suspects in New York because of the severity of the charges. Complicating matters, some of the suspects were also being arraigned on drug charges.

On August 25, 1993, Attorney General Janet Reno announced that she would prosecute the bombing case because of more evidence. That was a reversal from her position two months earlier, when she had said that there was insufficient evidence for prosecution. The same day, Abdel-Rahman was formally indicted in connection with three crimes: the landmark bombing plot, the World Trade Center bombing, and the 1990 assassination of Meir Kahane. The case against the defendants was prosecuted by lead prosecutor Andrew C. McCarthy. One of the defendants, Siddig Ali, changed his plea to guilty, and began cooperating with the prosecution, including allowing prosecutors to view his notes.

Salem ultimately testified against Abdel-Rahman and other terrorists despite earlier refusing to do so. Salem had recorded tapes in which the defendants sought to prevent Abdel-Rahman from being directly involved in the terror plot so that he would not be implicated. The defense lawyers unsuccessfully attempted to have all 13 defendants tried separately. New defense counsel were hired, and in September 1994, Judge Mukasey postponed the trial's opening date to December so that defense counsel could craft new arguments. In November 1994, Mukasey rescheduled the date to January 1995 because Abdel-Rahman had contracted pneumonia.

In February 1995, Siddig Ali pled guilty to the terror plot and also named some of the co-defendants as complicit in the plot. In 1999 Siddig Ali pleaded guilty to seditious conspiracy as well as other charges and received 11 years in prison after U.S. Attorney Mary Jo White wrote a letter to Judge Michael B. Mukasey describing his extensive cooperation.

Once the trial started, Salem testified about the details of the bomb plot. Defense lawyers cross-examining Salem argued that he was not credible because he had lied several times in the past, including when he was gaining his US citizenship. However, Salem testified that the defendants had confided the details of the plot to him. In May 1995, one of the defendants, Abdo Mohammed Haggag, agreed to testify against the other 11 defendants in exchange for all his charges being dropped. Salem testified that Abdel-Rahman, during a 13-hour-long bus ride from New Jersey to Detroit, had directed him to kill Mubarak. Adam Hamawy was called by the defense and testified that he had been a passenger on that van trip and had not heard Abdel-Rahman call for the assassination of the Egyptian president. Hamawy was not charged or accused of wrong-doing.

The defense of Abdel-Rahman and several other defendants centered around a first amendment claim. His lawyers argued that the seditious conspiracy statute is an unconstitutional burden on free speech and the free exercise of religion. They argued that the statute is overbroad and unconstitutionally vague, and that the convictions violated the First Amendment because it rested solely on their political views and religious practices.

On October 1, 1995, Abdel-Rahman and nine others were convicted by a New York jury on 48 of 50 charges, including seditious conspiracy, solicitation to murder Mubarak, conspiracy to murder Mubarak, solicitation to attack a US military installation, and conspiracy to conduct bombings. In January 1996, Mukasey sentenced Abdel-Rahman and nine other defendants to terms that ranged from 25 years to life in prison. Abdel-Rahman received life in prison. After the trial, Salem received a large sum of money and was put onto a witness protection program.

=== Appeals ===
Abdel-Rahman's appeal on the grounds that his first amendment rights were violated was denied in 1999 by the Second Circuit. The court ruled "[t]o be convicted under [the seditious conspiracy statute], one must conspire to use force, not just to advocate the use of force. We have no doubt that this passes the test of constitutionality." This upheld the previous rulings in United States v. Lebron (1955) and Dennis v. United States (1951).

== Aftermath ==
=== United States-Sudan relations ===
In August 1993, US government accused Sudan of state-sponsored terrorism. Though they provided no evidence, they claimed that Sudan played a role in the plot. Many of people arrested carried Sudanese passports and Abdel-Rahman, received his visa for his trip to the United States in Sudan. FBI translations of the wire taps between Siddig Ali and Salem included Siddig Ali speaking of contacts inside the Sudanese government, and the two men discussed using a van from the Sudanese mission to carry the car bomb into the United Nations complex. The Sudanese government denied any role in the plot.

In 1996, the United States expelled two Sudanese diplomats, accusing them of providing the conspirators with details about the United Nations and about a planned visit by Hosni Mubarak to New York City in 1993. The United States pressed for diplomatic sanctions and a ban on airline flights to Sudan, but received insufficient support from the United Nations Security Council for economic or military sanctions for lack of sufficient support. By 1996, the United States still had not provided any evidence for a connection.

=== Domestic investigations ===
Up until the September 11 terrorist attacks, the handling of the NYC landmark bomb plot was the typical way for the FBI to investigate terror plots, namely using informants and wiretaps, sometimes for years, before making any arrests. As the Washington Post reported in 2001, "The theory was that only such long-term investigations reveal useful information about potential plots." Attorney General John Ashcroft started making arrests earlier, before plots could develop, and this led to public criticism from former FBI officers. James Kallstrom said "You obviously want to play things out so you can fully identify the breadth and scope of the conspiracy. Obviously, the most efficient and effective way to do that is to bring it down to the last stage."

== Conspirators ==
According to Stratfor in 2008, the organizers had links to al-Qaeda.

=== Siddig Ibrahim Siddig Ali ===
Though he would later aid the prosecution in trying the case, Siddig Ibrahim Siddig Ali, a 32 year old Sudanese immigrant, "masterminded" the plot. He later admitted to helping select some of the targets for the attacks. He had previously raised funds and participated in tests for the 1993 World Trade Center bombing

He was a follower of Omar Abdel-Rahman, a blind radical Muslim sheikh.

=== Abdel-Rahman ===
Siddig Ali and Abdel-Rahman lived next door to each other in New Jersey.

=== El Sayyid Nosair ===
One of Abdel-Rahman's other followers, El Sayyid Nosair, had been acquitted in 1991 for state-level murder charges of Meir Kahane in 1990 and was also linked to the World Trade Center bombing. These connections later became the justification for the FBI to argue that the plots were all connected, leading to a re-trial and eventual federal conviction for Nosair, as well as conviction of Abdel-Rahman as the leader of a seditious conspiracy using RICO.

=== Clement Rodney Hampton-El ===
Clement Rodney Hampton-El, also known as Rasheed Hampton, Abdul Rashid Abdullah, and Dr. Rashid (1938 – June 30, 2014) was one of those convicted in the bomb plot. He was a member of the Moorish Science Temple of America. Hampton-El was born in the United States in 1938. He lived in an apartment in the Midwood section of Brooklyn for 25 years. His neighbors described him as quiet, but nice - he used to buy candy for the neighborhood children. He worked as a laboratory technician in a Brooklyn hospital.

He testified that in 1988 he went to Afghanistan to help the Muslims there during Soviet–Afghan War. During his trial in 1995, he admitted that he trained volunteer soldiers planning a mission to defend Bosnian Muslims against Serbian aggression - "Project Bosnia". In 1992 and 1993 he made several trips to Europe and Asia, raising over $150,000 to start the volunteer Muslim-militia project. He was sentenced to 35 years in prison for his involvement in New York bomb plot.

Hampton-El died in prison on June 30, 2014, aged 76.

== Alternative theories ==
Laurie Mylroie, an American author and analyst who has written extensively on Iraq and the war on terror, put forward an alternative theory on the events.

In 2008, Laurie Mylroie, writing in the New York Sun, reviewed Willful Blindness by Andrew C. McCarthy, who had prosecuted Sheik Omar Abdel Rahman in 1995. Mylroie explained that Rahman had not ordered the bombing of the World Trade Center—nor was he charged with doing so. She also explained that other elements of the plot had been organized by Sudan, as the trial transcript made clear. She complained that McCarthy understated "the degree to which the extremists were penetrated by the intelligence agencies of several states." She argued that this was the basic flaw of the Clinton era handling of terrorism: it focused on the arrest and trial of perps and ignored state sponsorship.

Replying on National Review Online, McCarthy accused Mylroie of misunderstanding "the difference between intrigue and evidence, between history and prosecution." Calling Rahman "the central figure in the overarching conspiracy," he wrote: "At trial, we proved that Sheikh Abdel Rahman had close ties to Hassan al-Turabi, leader in the early 1990s of Sudan's de facto government, the National Islamic Front." At this point, Daniel Pipes wrote a blog entry attacking "Laurie Mylroie's Shoddy, Loopy, Zany Theories." Stephen F. Hayes of The Weekly Standard added: "no one I know took her arguments very seriously."

Mylroie responded to McCarthy, saying that McCarthy himself had written in his book that the original case against Rahman was "weak" and so, she wrote, "different acts of violence, including the WTC bombing, were somewhat artificially linked" to strengthen the charges against him. She emphasized McCarthy's comment that Rahman was never charged with the "substantive crime" of bombing the World Trade Center. The debate continued in the New York Sun.

== See also ==
- 2009 Bronx terrorism plot
- 2008 Mumbai attacks - Mumbai attacks were primarily based upon the New York City landmark bomb plot
- Bojinka plot
- Dennis v. United States - the legal precedent that the defense challenged during trial
