= Abdul Rahman Yasin =

Iraqi-American terrorist and fugitive (born 1960)

- عبد الرحمن يس
- Born: April 10, 1960 (age 66); Bloomington, Indiana, U.S.
- Military career
- Nicknames: Abdul Rahman Said Yasin; Aboud Yasin; Abdul Rahman S. Taha; Abdul Rahman S. Taher

Abdul Rahman Yasin (Arabic: عبد الرحمن يس; born April 10, 1960) is an Iraqi-American Islamist militant and fugitive who took part in the 1993 World Trade Center bombing. Yasin is presumed to have helped assemble the bombs and explosives. He has been characterized in the American media as "the only participant in the first attempt to blow up the World Trade Center in 1993 who was never caught." Yasin's whereabouts remain unknown.

== Early life and education ==
Yasin was born in Bloomington, Indiana on April 10, 1960, where his father, originally from Iraq, went to study for a PhD. Shortly after his birth, Yasin's family moved back to Iraq. Yasin's FBI report states that he is epileptic.

== Arrival in United States, 1992 ==
In 1992, Yasin was able to use his American birth citizenship to obtain a U.S. passport and enter the United States.

Recruited by Ramzi Yousef, he had acid burns on his legs from bomb chemicals.

During investigation of February 26, 1993 attack, Yasin was picked up by the FBI on March 4, 1993, the same day as the arrest of Mohammed A. Salameh, in a sweep of sites associated with Salameh. Yasin was found in the apartment in Jersey City, New Jersey, that he was sharing with his mother. Yasin was taken to New Jersey FBI headquarters in Newark, where he was reportedly very cooperative. Agents had Yasin retrace where and how the WTC bomb had been built in New York and New Jersey. Yasin said he was released after giving agents names and addresses, and went to Iraq.

== Return to Iraq and imprisonment ==
In March 1993, Yasin boarded Royal Jordanian flight 262 to Amman, Jordan. From Amman, Yasin went on to Baghdad. In 1994, the Iraqi authorities arrested and imprisoned Yasin, and sent an emissary to the State Department to inform them that they had crucial information about a perpetrator of the World Trade Center attack and were prepared to cooperate. The State Department did not respond to the offer. In November 1997, two others were convicted in a court for their contributions to the bombing, but only "one other man believed to be directly involved in the attack, Iraqi Abdul Rahman Yasin, remained at large."

On October 10, 2001, Yasin's name appeared at the top of the list of the FBI's 22 Most Wanted Terrorists, which was released to the public by President George W. Bush with a $5 million reward for information leading to his capture.

In 2002, following the September 11th attacks, Iraq attempted to hand Yasin over to the US government and began negotiating extradition protocols with the Americans via Egypt. However, negotiations hit a snag when U.S. intelligence refused to provide Iraq with a receipt citing unfair demands, an official statement acknowledging Yasin had been handed over.

On May 23, 2002, the Iraqis gave Lesley Stahl of CBS News access to an Iraqi prison to interview Yasin for a segment on 60 Minutes where Yasin appeared in prison pajamas and handcuffs. The Iraqis stated they had held Yasin prisoner on the outskirts of Baghdad since 1994. Yasin has not been seen or heard from since the 2002 prison interview.

After the 2003 invasion of Iraq, large numbers of Iraqi government documents were retrieved by U.S. intelligence. An anonymous U.S. intelligence official claimed to USA Today that "some of the analysts concluded that the documents show that Saddam's government provided monthly payments and a home for Yasin." However, intelligence and law enforcement officials disagreed on its conclusiveness.

== Al-Qaeda sanctions listing ==
Although a direct al-Qaeda role in the 1993 WTC attack was never established, Abdul Rahman Yasin was listed on 17 October 2001 as being associated with the organization known as al-Qaeda, the individual named Osama bin Laden and the organization known as the Taliban, for his participation:

"in the financing, planning, facilitating, preparing or perpetrating of acts or activities by, in conjunction with, under the name of, on behalf, or in support of", "supplying, selling or transferring arms and related materiel to" or "otherwise supporting acts or activities of" al-Qaeda (QDe.004), Osama bin Laden, and the Taliban.
