= Ned Eisenberg =

American actor (1957–2022)

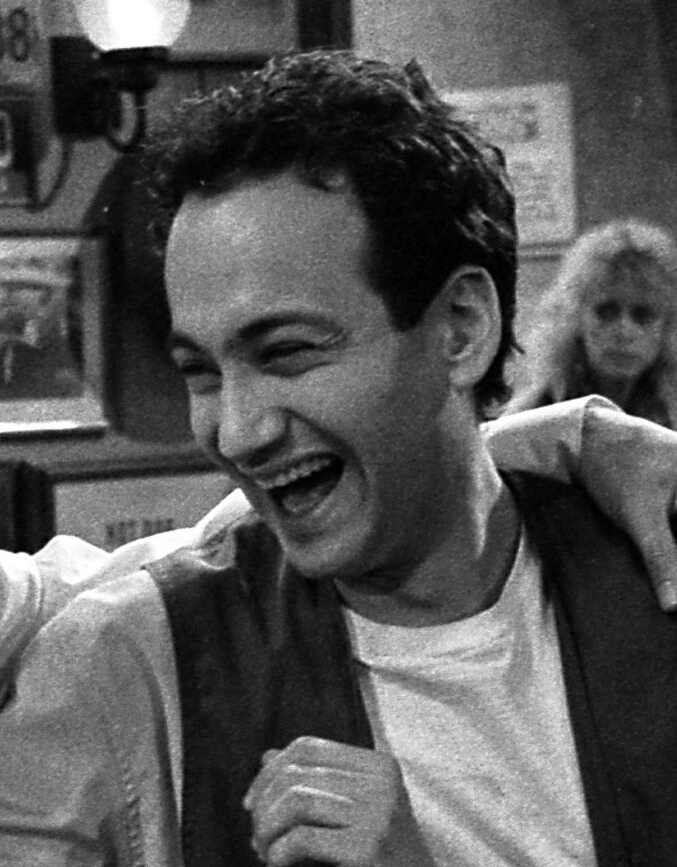
- Eisenberg in 1986
- Born: January 13, 1957; The Bronx, New York City, U.S.
- Died: February 27, 2022 (aged 65); Queens, New York City, U.S.
- Years active: 1980–2022
- Spouse: Patricia Dunnock
- Children: 1

Ned Eisenberg (January 13, 1957 – February 27, 2022) was an American actor known for his recurring role on Law & Order: Special Victims Unit as Roger Kressler.

== Early life and education ==
Eisenberg was born in The Bronx in 1957, where he grew up in the Riverdale neighborhood. He graduated from Riverdale Junior High School in 1972 and from there went on to the Performing Arts High School, a subsidiary of Fiorello H. LaGuardia High School. He described himself as a "street-style" actor, coming up through the ranks rather than academic programs, and his training included jazz-dance classes with Betsy Haug.

== Career ==
Eisenberg had a leading role in the film Key Exchange (1985), followed by a major tour of the Broadway play Brighton Beach Memoirs, and guest starred on various 1980s television series such as The Equalizer and Miami Vice. This led to a starring role in the television comedy The Fanelli Boys, which also starred Christopher Meloni and Joe Pantoliano. He also played supporting roles in films such as The Exterminator (1980), The Burning (1981), Slayground (1983), Moving Violations (1985), Air America (1990), Last Man Standing (1996), Primary Colors (1998), A Civil Action (1998), Woody Allen's Celebrity (1998), and Experimenter (2015).

In 1987, he cofounded the Naked Angels Theatre Company with longtime friend Fisher Stevens.

Beginning in 1997, Eisenberg appeared on the NBC series Law & Order, typically playing a defense attorney. He had a recurring role on spinoff Law & Order: Special Victims Unit as defense attorney Roger Kressler. In 1999, he appeared in the first season episode of The Sopranos ("Denial, Anger, Acceptance") as Ariel. He also continued his film career by appearing in Clint Eastwood's Academy Award–winning drama Million Dollar Baby (2004) and played the role of photographer Joe Rosenthal in the 2006 film Flags of Our Fathers, also directed by Eastwood.

== Personal life and death ==
Eisenberg was married to actress Patricia Dunnock, and had one son.

Eisenberg died from complications of cholangiocarcinoma and uveal melanoma at his home in Jackson Heights, Queens, on February 27, 2022, at the age of 65. In the last two years of his life, Eisenberg continued to work while fighting cancer in private, ensuring that he and his family still had medical coverage and financial stability due to his earnings.

== Filmography ==
=== Film ===
Year	Title	Role	Notes
1980	The Exterminator	Marty	
1981	The Burning	Eddy	
1982	The Soldier	Israeli Prisoner	
1983	Deadly Force	Rat Game Owner	
1983	Slayground	Lonzini	
1984	Firstborn	Learner Driver	Uncredited
1985	Moving Violations	"Wink" Barnes	
1985	Key Exchange	Piero	
1987	Hiding Out	Rodriguez	
1990	Air America	Pirelli	
1996	Last Man Standing	Fredo Strozzi	
1998	Primary Colors	Brad Lieberman	
1998	Celebrity	Elaine's Book Party Guest	
1998	A Civil Action	Pete "Uncle Pete"	
1999	Let It Snow	Carl	
2003	Head of State	Mike Blake	
2004	Million Dollar Baby	Salvador "Sally" Mendoza	
2006	World Trade Center	Officer Polnicki	
2006	Flags of Our Fathers	Joe Rosenthal	
2011	Limitless	Morris Brandt	
2012	Won't Back Down	Arthur Gould	
2015	Experimenter	Solomon Asch	
2015	Meadowland	Principal Griffin	
2018	Asher	Abram	

=== Television ===
Year	Title	Role	Notes
1981	We're Fighting Back	"Ace"	Television film
1985–1989	Miami Vice	Various Characters	4 episodes
1986	Crime Story	Dr. Eisenberg	Episode: "Abrams for the Defense"
1986	The Equalizer	Terrorist	Episode: "Breakpoint"
1987	The Equalizer	Josh	Episode: "The Rehearsal"
1989	Charlie	Al Hattman	Television film
1990–1991	The Fanelli Boys	Anthony Fanelli	19 episodes
1992	Dear John	C.J.	Episode: "The Big Payday"
1992	A Murderous Affair: The Carolyn Warmus Story	Detective Richard Freedman	Television film
1992	Reasonable Doubts	Kyle Wynn	Episode: "Brother's Keeper"
1993	L.A. Law	Howard Bannister	Episode: "Leap of Faith"
1994	Time Trax	Mitch	Episode: "Missing"
1994	Star Struck	Mickey	Television film
1996	Public Morals	Llama Salesman	Episode: "The Purple Cover"
1997	Path to Paradise: The Untold Story of the World Trade Center Bombing	Emad Salem	Television film
1997–2009	Law & Order	James Granick	7 episodes
1998	Exiled	Jerry Kleinert	Television film
1998	The First Seven Years	Sobel	Television film
1999	The Sopranos	Ariel	Episode: "Denial, Anger, Acceptance"
1999	Dash and Lilly	Bob Constantine	Television film
1999–2006, 2008–2011, 2013, 2016, 2018–2019	Law & Order: Special Victims Unit	Defense Attorney Roger Kressler / Defense Attorney Klein Rothberg / Jerry Kleinert	24 episodes
2000	Cheaters	Robert Clifford	Television film
2002	NYPD Blue	Victor "Vic" Davis	Episode: "One in the Nuts"
2002, 2007	Law & Order: Criminal Intent	Artie Ableson / Danny Sussman	2 episodes
2003	Queens Supreme	Lawyer	Episode: "The House Next Door"
2003	Whoopi	Judge	Episode: "Shout"
2004	Dragnet	Peter Radic / Vukov Regad	Episode: "Retribution"
2004	The Jury	Elliot Riis	Episode: "Pilot"
2004	Rescue Me	Burt	Episode: "Orphans"
2006	3 lbs	Brad Ellis	Episode: "Heart Stopping"
2007	The Black Donnellys	Detective Frankie Stein	4 episodes
2008	New Amsterdam	Fiske	Episode: "Love Hurts"
2011	The Big C	Dr. Volimer	Episode: "Losing Patients"
2011	Blue Bloods	Sandy	Episode: "Lonely Hearts Club"
2012	30 Rock	Marty	Episode: "Today You Are a Man"
2012	White Collar	Walt Furlong	Episode: "Vested Interest"
2012	Made in Jersey	Assistant District Attorney Diego Haas	2 episodes
2013, 2016	Person of Interest	Detective Joseph Soriano	2 episodes
2014	Madam Secretary	Dan Pasternak	Episode: "The Call"
2014	The Mysteries of Laura	Julius Sarkissian	Episode: "The Mystery of the Art Ace"
2015	The Good Wife	Craig Hallman	Episode: "Driven"
2016	The Night Of	Lawrence Felder	2 episodes
2016	Bull	Christopher Franklin	Episode: "Too Perfect"
2018	Elementary	Marvin Hathaway	Episode: "The Geek Interpreter"
2019–2022	The Marvelous Mrs. Maisel	Lou Rabinowitz	2 episodes
2020	The Plot Against America	Abe Steinheim	Episode: "Part 2"
2020	Little Voice	Al	6 episodes
2021	Mare of Easttown	Detective Hauser	3 episodes
2021	The Blacklist	Vito Decanio	Episode: "Dr. Roberta Sand, Ph.D."
