= Nidal Ayyad =

Participant in the 1993 WTC bombing

- نضال عياد
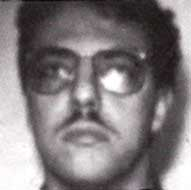
- Ayyad in 1994
- Born: Nidal A. Ayyad; 1968 (age 57–58); Kuwait
- Education: Rutgers University
- Known for: 1993 World Trade Center bombing
- Status: Incarcerated
- Convictions: Conspiracy to bomb a building used in interstate and foreign commerce Conspiracy to bomb property and vehicles owned, used, and leased by an agency of the United States; Conspiracy to transport explosives in interstate commerce Conspiracy to bomb or destroy a vehicle used in interstate commerce resulting in death (2 counts); Conspiracy to assault federal officers Conspiracy to use and carry a destructive device during a crime of violence Making false statements on immigration documents
- Penalty: 240 years imprisonment; commuted to 86 years imprisonment

Details
- Date apprehended: March 10, 1993
- Imprisoned at: United States Penitentiary, Coleman

Nidal A. Ayyad (Arabic: نضال عياد; born 1968) is a convicted perpetrator of the 1993 World Trade Center bombing. He is currently serving an 86-year sentence at United States Penitentiary, Coleman for his role in the bombing.

== Early life and education ==
Ayyad was born in 1968 in Kuwait to Palestinian parents after they fled Palestine due to the Six-Day War, he moved to the United States in 1985, became a naturalized U.S. citizen in 1991, graduated from Rutgers University and worked as a chemical engineer at AlliedSignal in New Jersey.

== Role in World Trade Center bombing ==
The key mastermind behind the bombing, Ramzi Yousef, met up with Ayyad and the other conspirators. They planned to drive a truck to the World Trade Center parking garage and detonate a bomb causing the Twin Towers to collapse, which would have caused thousands of deaths. Instead, the explosion did not go accordingly and did not cause the building to collapse but rather destroyed the parking garage, killing 6 people. Ayyad had helped with coordinating the bombing and helping the group succeed with the scheme.

== Arrest and sentencing ==
Ayyad was arrested on March 10, 1993 the FBI matched his DNA to traces of saliva found on the letter's envelope. An FBI specialist later recovered a document from Ayyad's work computer. In March 1994, Ayyad and four co-participants Mohammed A. Salameh, Mahmud Abouhalima, and Ahmad Ajaj were each convicted in the World Trade Center bombing. In May 1994, they were sentenced to 240 years in prison. In the years since, they have received several sentencing reductions, which could allow them to walk free in their 90s/100s. He is currently being held at United States Penitentiary, Coleman, in Florida and serving an 86-year sentence and will be released in 2067.
