= Assassination of Meir Kahane =

1990 murder in New York City, U.S.

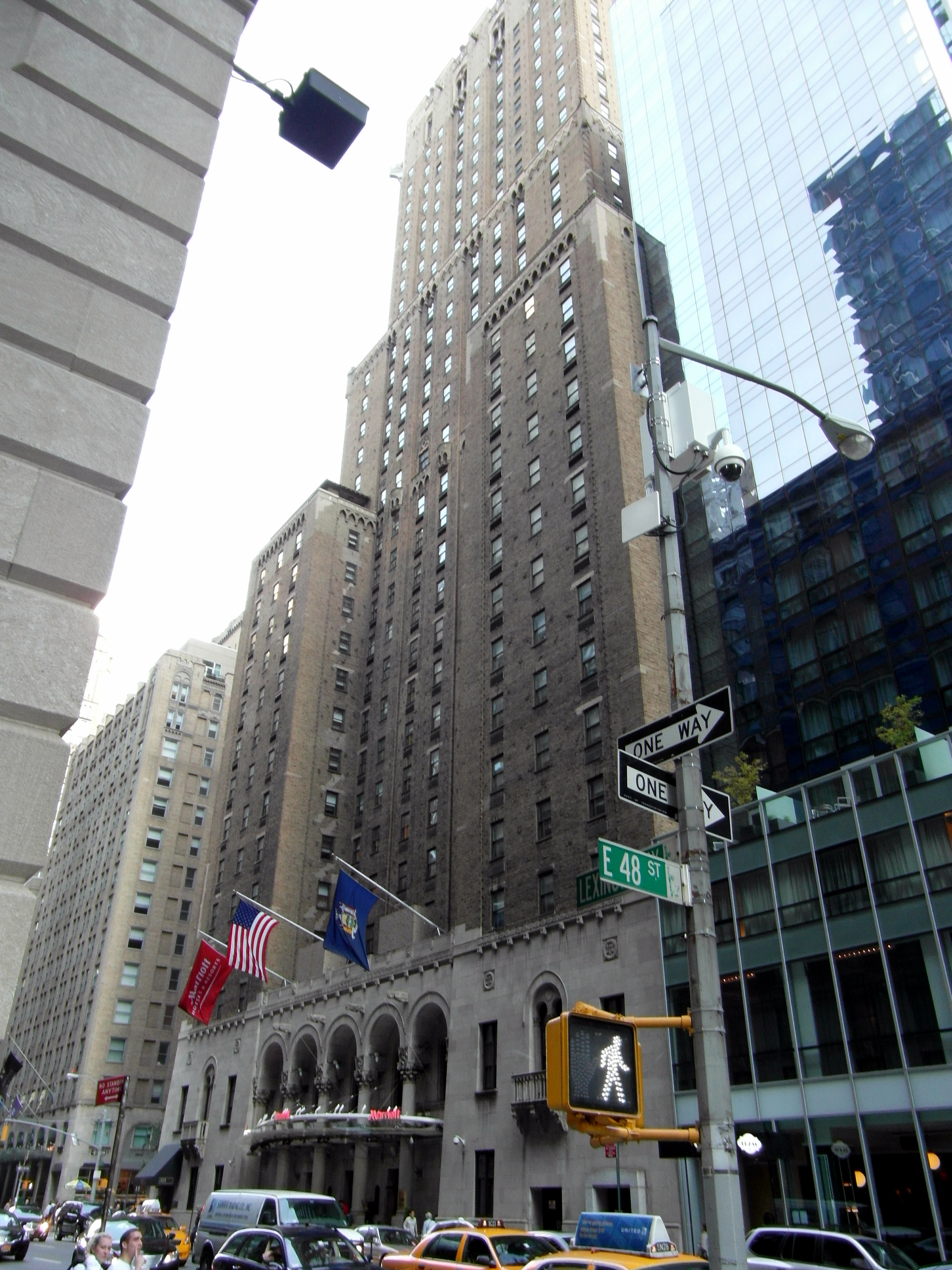
- 525 Lexington Avenue, formerly the New York Marriott East Side
- Location: 40°45′20″N 73°58′22″W; 525 Lexington Avenue; New York Marriott East Side, New York City, U.S.
- Date: 5 November 1990 (18 Cheshvan 5751); Shortly after 9:00 p.m. (EST)
- Attack type: Assassination by shooting
- Weapon: .357-caliber pistol
- Perpetrator: El Sayyid Nosair
- Motive: Islamic extremism

On 5 November 1990, Meir Kahane, an Israeli-American rabbi, ultranationalist politician, and convicted domestic terrorist, was assassinated by El Sayyid Nosair, an American Islamic extremist, at the New York Marriott East Side hotel (now named 525 Lexington Avenue) in Manhattan, New York City.

On the second floor of the hotel, while Kahane was speaking to an audience, Nosair fatally shot him in the neck with a pistol, then escaped onto Lexington Avenue. While trying to take over a taxi at gunpoint, he shot a U.S. Postal Inspection Service officer who saw the carjacking attempt, Carlos Acosta. Acosta then shot and arrested Nosair; the two survived their injuries.

Nosair initially denied being Kahane's assassin. He was convicted for assault, possession of an illegal firearm, and of shooting Acosta, but not the assassination; Kahane's family opposed him getting an autopsy. He was sentenced to 22 years in prison, and took responsibility for the shooting years later.

== Background ==
Meir David HaKohen Kahane (/kəˈhɑːnə/ kə-HAH-nə; Hebrew: מאיר דוד הכהן כהנא; born Martin David Kahane; August 1, 1932 – November 5, 1990) was an American-born Israeli Orthodox rabbi, writer, and politician. He was the founder of the Israeli political party Kach, which promoted an ultra-nationalist ideology that continues to influence some militant and far-right political groups active today in Israel. Kahane was convicted in the United States and Israel for offenses related to terrorism.

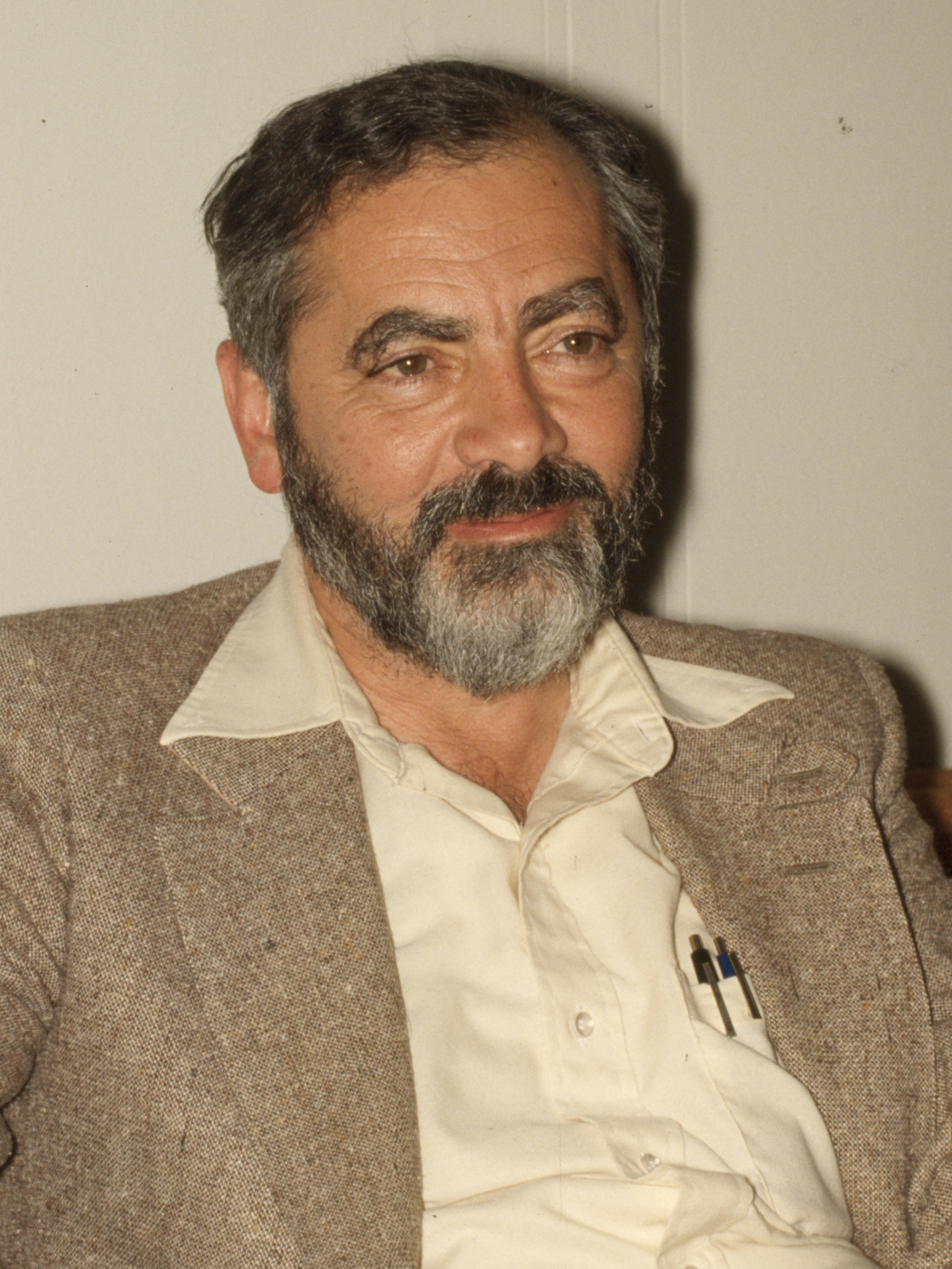
Meir Kahane

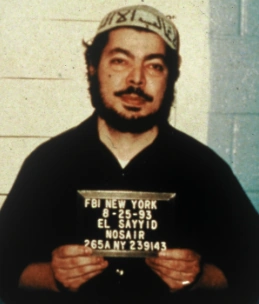
El Sayyid Nosair

El Sayyid Nosair was born in 1955 in Port Said, Egypt, and immigrated to the United States in 1981. He became an American citizen in 1989. In the United States, Nosair worked various jobs in New Jersey and New York City. Nosair was employed by the City of New York to repair the air conditioning equipment at the criminal courts building.

Nosair expressed dislike for American culture and what he viewed to be rampant moral corruption. Nosair became involved with the al-Farouq Mosque in Brooklyn, which was supported by the Maktab al-Khidamat (Afghanistan Services Bureau). The Services Bureau was established in 1984 by Osama bin Laden and Abdullah Azzam in Peshawar, Pakistan to raise funds for the Arab mujahadeen during the Soviet–Afghan War, as well as recruitment. Ali Mohamed, a sergeant at Fort Bragg, provided United States Army manuals and other assistance to individuals at the al-Farouq Mosque, and some members, including Mahmoud Abouhalima and Nosair, practiced at the Calverton Shooting Range on Long Island.

== Assassination ==
On the evening of 5 November 1990, Kahane gave a speech in the second-floor lecture hall of the New York Marriott East Side hotel, in Manhattan, at 525 Lexington Avenue, to an audience, most of whom were Orthodox Jews. After his speech, a crowd of well-wishers gathered around Kahane as he answered questions. Shortly after 9:00 p.m., Nosair, disguised as an Orthodox Jew, approached Kahane and shot him from close range with a .357-caliber pistol. Kahane was hit in the neck, and died of his wounds shortly thereafter.

Nosair then fled from the hotel and reached Lexington Avenue, where, in front of a post office, he attempted to take over a taxi at gunpoint. Carlos Acosta, an on-duty U.S. Postal Inspection Service officer, drew his pistol and ordered Nosair to freeze. Instead, Nosair turned toward Acosta, and shot him in the chest. Acosta returned fire, hitting Nosair in the chin. Afterwards, Acosta arrested him.

At the time, Nosair's assassination of Kahane was categorized as an antisemitic hate crime. In subsequent years, Nosair's actions have been re-evaluated as an early example of Islamic terrorism in the United States.

== Prosecution of Nosair ==
Nosair was charged with murdering Kahane. During the legal proceedings, Nosair denied all charges against him. Although there were witnesses who identified Nosair as the assassin, Nosair was not convicted of Kahane's assassination, in part because Kahane's family had opposed the performing of an autopsy and the extracting of the bullets. However, Nosair was convicted of assault, possession of an illegal firearm, and of shooting a United States Postal Inspection Service agent. Nosair was sentenced to 22 years of imprisonment, the maximum allowed.

Nosair initially served his sentence at Attica Correctional Facility, in New York. In 1993, the "Blind Sheikh," Omar Abdel-Rahman, was arrested in New York. An investigation later revealed that a terrorist cell, led by Abdel-Rahman, conducted detailed surveillance of Attica facilities and that it had discussed plans to use a truck bomb attack, combined with an armed assault, to rescue Nosair from prison.

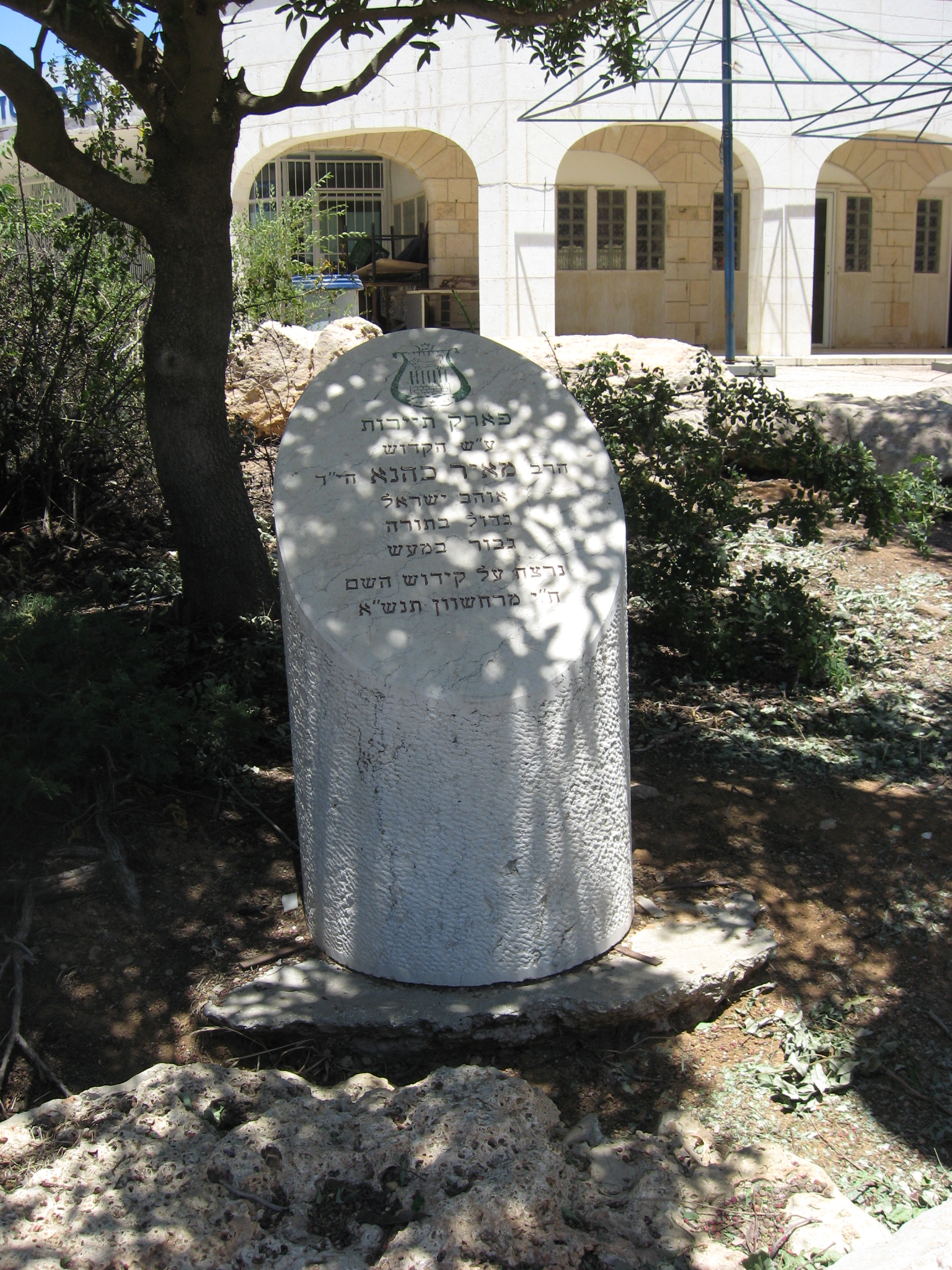
Monument to Kahane in Kahane Park, in the Israeli settlement of Kiryat Arba in the West Bank

Several years after the 1993 World Trade Center bombing, Nosair made a confession to federal agents of assassinating Kahane.

== Possible accomplices ==
In August 2010, the Israeli newspaper The Jerusalem Post, which, in turn, quoted from the mid-August issue of Playboy, claimed that Nosair had two accomplices, and that his original target was Israeli military figure and future Israeli Prime Minister Ariel Sharon. "He added that on the night he shot Kahane dead, he was accompanied by two co-conspirators to the Marriot Hotel in Manhattan where Kahane was speaking – one of whom was also carrying a gun. The men, Bilal al-Kaisi of Jordan and Mohammed A. Salameh, a Palestinian illegal immigrant later convicted of 1993 World Trade Center bombing, have never been charged for their involvement in the assassination.

== See also ==
- Assassination of Robert F. Kennedy
- Assassination of Yitzhak Rabin
