= Eyad Ismoil =

Jordanian participant in the 1993 WTC bombing (born 1971)

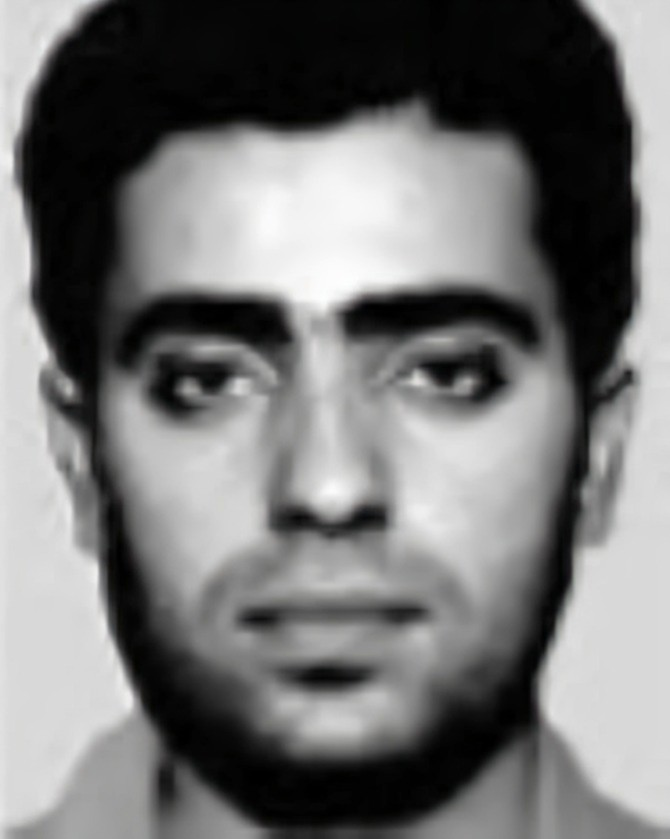
- Ismoil's FBI photo, 1994
- Born: June 8, 1971 (age 55); Jordan
- Occupation: Engineering student
- Status: Incarcerated
- Convictions: Conspiracy to bomb a building used in interstate and foreign commerce Conspiracy to bomb property and vehicles owned, used, and leased by an agency of the United States; Conspiracy to transport a bomb in interstate commerce Conspiracy to bomb or destroy a vehicle used in interstate commerce resulting in death (2 counts); Conspiracy to assault federal officers Conspiracy to use and carry a destructive device during a crime of violence (2 counts); Conspiracy to traveling and using facilities in interstate and/or foreign commerce to commit crimes of violence
- Penalty: 240 years' imprisonment; commuted to 210 years' imprisonment

Details
- Imprisoned at: United States Penitentiary, Lee

Eyad Ismoil (Arabic: اياد اسماعيل; born June 8, 1971) is a Jordanian convicted terrorist, for his role in the 1993 World Trade Center bombing, was convicted by the United States District Court for the Southern District of New York of conspiracy in 1997.

== Early life ==
Born in Jordan, Ismoil attended high school in Jordan. He entered the United States in 1989 on a student visa to study engineering at Wichita State University, where he enrolled at the Intensive English Language Center to study English as a second language. Ismoil overstayed his visa and moved to Dallas, Texas. In December 1992, he was contacted by Ramzi Ahmed Yousef, with whom he re-located to New York City on February 22, 1993, to begin preparing for the attack.

== World Trade Center bombing ==
On February 26, 1993, Ismoil, accompanied by Yousef, drove a van packed with explosives into the parking garage below the World Trade Center in Manhattan, New York. The van exploded at 12:17 p.m., killing six people, causing numerous injuries, and inflicting an estimated five hundred million dollars' worth of damage to the WTC. Ismail fled the United States that night, as did Yousef, on a separate flight.

In August 1995, Ismoil was captured by Jordanian authorities in Amman and extradited to the United States to stand trial in New York for his role in the bombing.

According to Ismoil's attorney, Louis Aidala, Ismoil was tricked into cooperating with the others, and had in fact loaded the explosives into the van, thinking they were cleaning supplies. However, prosecutor David Kelly noted the fingerprints of both men which had been found in a Jersey City, New Jersey apartment where the bomb had been manufactured, telephone records, and automatic teller machine surveillance videos linking both Ismoil and Yousef to the purchase of chemicals used to create explosives.

On November 12, 1997, Ismoil, Yousef, and several other co-defendants were found guilty of conspiracy.

On April 3, 1998, Ismoil was sentenced to 240 years in prison, fined $250,000, and ordered to pay $10,000,000 in restitution. Throughout the trial, Ismoil continued to maintain his innocence. On appeal, his sentence was reduced to 210 years.
