= Emad Salem =

FBI informant

Emad A. Salem (born circa 1950) is an FBI informant, who was a key witness in the trial of Ramzi Yousef, Abdul Hakim Murad, and Wali Khan Amin Shah, convicted in the World Trade Center bombing of February 26, 1993. He testified that the bomb was built under supervision from the FBI.

An Egyptian army officer, Salem claimed to have fought as a sniper in the Yom Kippur War of 1973. He held 17 Israeli soldiers as prisoners of war respecting their rights under international law. All POWs were ultimately returned unharmed to Israel. At the request of the FBI, Salem had befriended the group of plotters in 1991, meeting them at El Sayyid Nosair's trial. He had recently worked as a security guard at the Bergdorf Goodman department store, and an engineer at a Best Western hotel in New York. Salem was working as head of hotel security at the Woodward, on the corner of Broadway and Fifty-fifth Street in New York when, in August 1991, he met and offered information to FBI Agent Nancy Floyd, who came to the hotel to inquire about Russian diplomats who might have frequented the hotel. At a later meeting, Salem offered that he knew of an Egyptian in NYC who posed far more dangers to the public than KGB agents. He then named the blind sheikh, Omar Ahmad Ali Abdel-Rahman. It was following this meeting that Salem agreed to work for the FBI as an informant on the blind sheikh's circle centered in NYC mosques.

During his time as an FBI informant, Salem recorded hours of telephone conversations with his FBI handlers, and reports submitted in court. In tapes made after the bombings, Salem alleged that an unnamed FBI supervisor declined to move forward on a plan that would have used a "phony powder" to fool the conspirators into believing that they were working with genuine explosives. Federal authorities denied Salem's view of events and The New York Times concluded that the tapes do not make clear the extent to which federal authorities knew that there was a plan to bomb the World Trade Center, merely that they knew that a bombing of some sort was being discussed. But for the recordings, Emad would have been charged as a co-conspirator. It was recordings that were never provided to the New York Times that prevented the FBI from charging Emad.

== Bibliography ==
- "Tapes in Bombing Plot Show Informer and F.B.I. at Odds," Ralph Blumenthal, The New York Times, October 27, 1993, Section A; Page 1; Column 4
- "Tapes Depict Proposal to Thwart Bomb Used in Trade Center Blast," Ralph Blumenthal, The New York Times, October 28, 1993, Section A; Page 1; Column 4
- "Paper Says FBI Blocked Plan to Foil N.Y. Blast," Reuters, Los Angeles Times, October 28, 1993, Page 21; Section Part-A; National Desk
- Bernstein, Richard; Blumenthal, Ralph (October 31, 1993). "Bomb Informer's Tapes Give Rare Glimpse of F.B.I. Dealings". The New York Times.
- "FBI's Tipster Said He Built N.Y. Bomb," Chicago Tribune, December 15, 1993, Page 7; Section NEWS
- "Tracing terror's roots: How the first World Trade Center plot sowed the seeds for 9/11," Chitra Ragavan, U.S. News & World Report, February 16, 2003
