= James Kallstrom =

American FBI agent (1943–2021)

- Kallstrom in 1996
- Born: James Keith Kallstrom; May 6, 1943; Worcester, Massachusetts, U.S.
- Died: July 3, 2021 (aged 78); Fairfield, Connecticut, U.S.
- Education: University of Massachusetts Amherst (BBA)
- Occupation: FBI agent
- Spouse: Susan Kallstrom (m. 1971)
- Children: 2

James Keith Kallstrom (May 6, 1943 – July 3, 2021), was an American Federal Bureau of Investigation (FBI) agent who served as assistant director in charge of its field office in New York. He was noted for heading the criminal investigation into the TWA Flight 800 crash in 1996.

== Early life ==
Kallstrom was born in Worcester, Massachusetts, on May 6, 1943. His father was a trumpeter during the swing era and subsequently worked as a car salesman; his mother was employed as a nurse. He studied at the University of Massachusetts Amherst, obtaining a Bachelor of Business Administration in 1966. He joined the US Marine Corps that same year, eventually rising to the rank of captain. He served two tours in the Vietnam War.

== Career ==
Kallstrom worked for 27 years at the FBI from February 1970 to December 31, 1997 and was described as an expert in wiretapping. During his career, he was a leading advocate of expanding wiretapping power through the Communications Assistance for Law Enforcement Act (CALEA). He headed the special operations division at the Bureau's field office in New York. He later became assistant director in charge of the office in 1995, a position he held until his retirement two years later. He led the investigation into the 1996 explosion of TWA Flight 800. He was also a supervising agent in the New York investigation of the Cosa Nostra criminal network that resulted in the Mafia Commission Trial of 1985–1986.

Kallstrom left government work for private sector employment in the financial industry beginning in 1998. After the September 11 attacks in 2001, he returned to the public sector to lead New York state's public safety office at the request of George Pataki.

== Later life ==
Kallstrom was the host of the Discovery Channel show The FBI Files until it was cancelled in 2006. He supported Donald Trump during the 2016 United States presidential election and referred to Hillary Clinton and the Clinton family as being criminal-like. He was also critical of the Special Counsel investigation by Robert Mueller, saying in 2018 that it was orchestrated by a cabal beyond the scope of the FBI and the intelligence community. He added that he "did not recognize the agency I gave 28 years of my life to".

== Personal life ==
Kallstrom was married to Susan for 50 years until his death. Together, they had two children, Erika and Kristél.

Kallstrom died on July 3, 2021, at his home in Fairfield, Connecticut. He was 78, and suffered from a rare form of blood cancer prior to his death.
