= 1993 World Trade Center bombing =

Terrorist attack in the United States

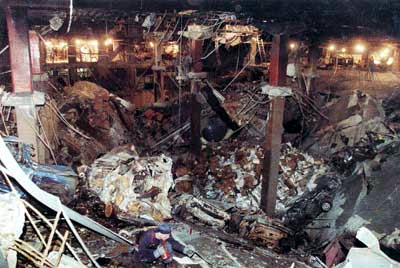
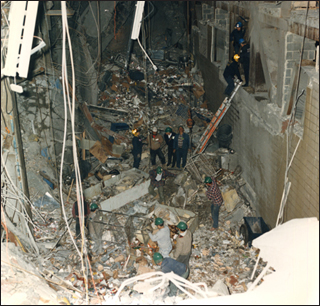
- Underground damage after the bombing
- Location: 40.711452°N 74.011919°W; World Trade Center; Manhattan, New York City, U.S.
- Date: February 26, 1993; 33 years ago 12:18 p.m. (UTC−05:00)
- Target: World Trade Center
- Attack type: Van bombing, terrorist attack
- Deaths: 6 people and one unborn child
- Injuries: 1,042
- Perpetrators: Ramzi Yousef, Ahmed Ajaj, Eyad Ismoil, and co-conspirators
- Motive: Backlash against American foreign policy in the Middle East and U.S. support for Israel

On February 26, 1993, Ramzi Yousef and associates carried out a van bomb terrorist attack below the North Tower of the World Trade Center in New York City. The approximately 1,500-pound (680 kg) urea nitrate–hydrogen gas enhanced device was intended to make the North Tower collapse onto the South Tower, taking down both skyscrapers and killing tens of thousands of people. While it failed to do so, it was successful in killing six people, including a pregnant mother, and caused over a thousand injuries. About 50,000 people were evacuated from the buildings that day.

The attack was planned by a group of terrorists including Yousef, Ahmed Ajaj, Mahmud Abouhalima, Mohammed A. Salameh, Eyad Ismoil, Nidal Ayyad, and Abdul Rahman Yasin. In March 1994, four men were convicted of carrying out the bombing: Ajaj, Abouhalima, Ayyad, and Salameh. The charges included conspiracy, explosive destruction of property, and interstate transportation of explosives. In November 1997, two more were convicted: Ramzi Yousef, the organizer behind the bombings, and Eyad Ismoil, who drove the van carrying the bomb.

Emad Salem, an FBI informant and a key witness in the trial of Yousef, stated that the bomb was built under supervision from the FBI. During his time as an informant, Salem recorded hours of telephone conversations with his FBI handlers. In tapes made after the bombing, he alleged that an unnamed FBI supervisor declined to move forward on a plan that would have used a "phony powder" to fool the conspirators into believing that they were working with genuine explosives.

== Planning and organization ==
Yousef arrived illegally in the United States on September 1, 1992, traveling with Ahmed Ajaj from Pakistan, though both sat apart on the flight and acted as though they were traveling separately. Ajaj tried to enter using a forged Swedish passport, though it had been altered and thus raised suspicions among Immigration and Naturalization Service (INS) officials at John F. Kennedy International Airport. When officials put Ajaj through secondary inspection, they discovered bomb-making instructions and other materials in his luggage, and arrested him. The name Abu Barra, an alias of Mohammed Jamal Khalifa, appeared in the manuals. Yousef entered on a false Iraqi passport claiming political asylum, and was given a hearing date.

Yousef set up residence in Jersey City, New Jersey, traveled around New York and New Jersey and called Sheikh Omar Abdel-Rahman, a controversial blind Muslim cleric, via cell phone. After being introduced to his co-conspirators by Abdel Rahman at the latter's Al-Farooq Mosque in Brooklyn, Yousef began assembling the 1,500-pound (680 kg) urea nitrate–hydrogen gas enhanced device for delivery to the WTC. He ordered chemicals from his hospital room when he had been injured in a car crash – one of three accidents caused by Salameh in late 1992 and early in 1993.

El Sayyid Nosair, one of the blind sheikh's men, was arrested in 1991 for the murder of Rabbi Meir Kahane. According to prosecutors, "the Red" Mahmud Abouhalima, also convicted in the bombing, told Wadih el Hage to buy the .357 caliber revolver used by Nosair in the Kahane shooting. In the initial court case in NYS Criminal Court, Nosair was acquitted of murder but convicted of gun charges (in a related and follow-up case in Federal Court, he was convicted). Dozens of Arabic bomb-making manuals and documents related to terrorist plots were found in Nosair's New Jersey apartment, with manuals from Army Special Warfare Center at Fort Bragg, North Carolina, secret memos linked to the Joint Chiefs of Staff, and 1,440 rounds of ammunition.

According to the transcript of his trial, Yousef hoped that his explosion would topple Tower 1 which would fall into Tower 2, killing the occupants of both buildings, which he estimated to be about 250,000 people in revenge for U.S. support for Israel against Palestine.

According to journalist Steve Coll, Yousef mailed letters to various New York newspapers just before the attack, in which he claimed he belonged to "Liberation Army, Fifth Battalion".

These letters made three demands: an end to all US aid to Israel, an end to US diplomatic relations with Israel, and a pledge by the United States to end interference "with any of the Middle East countries' interior affairs." He stated that the attack on the World Trade Center would be merely the first of such attacks if his demands were not met. Yousef did not make any religious justification for the bombing. When asked about his religious views, he was evasive.

== Attack ==
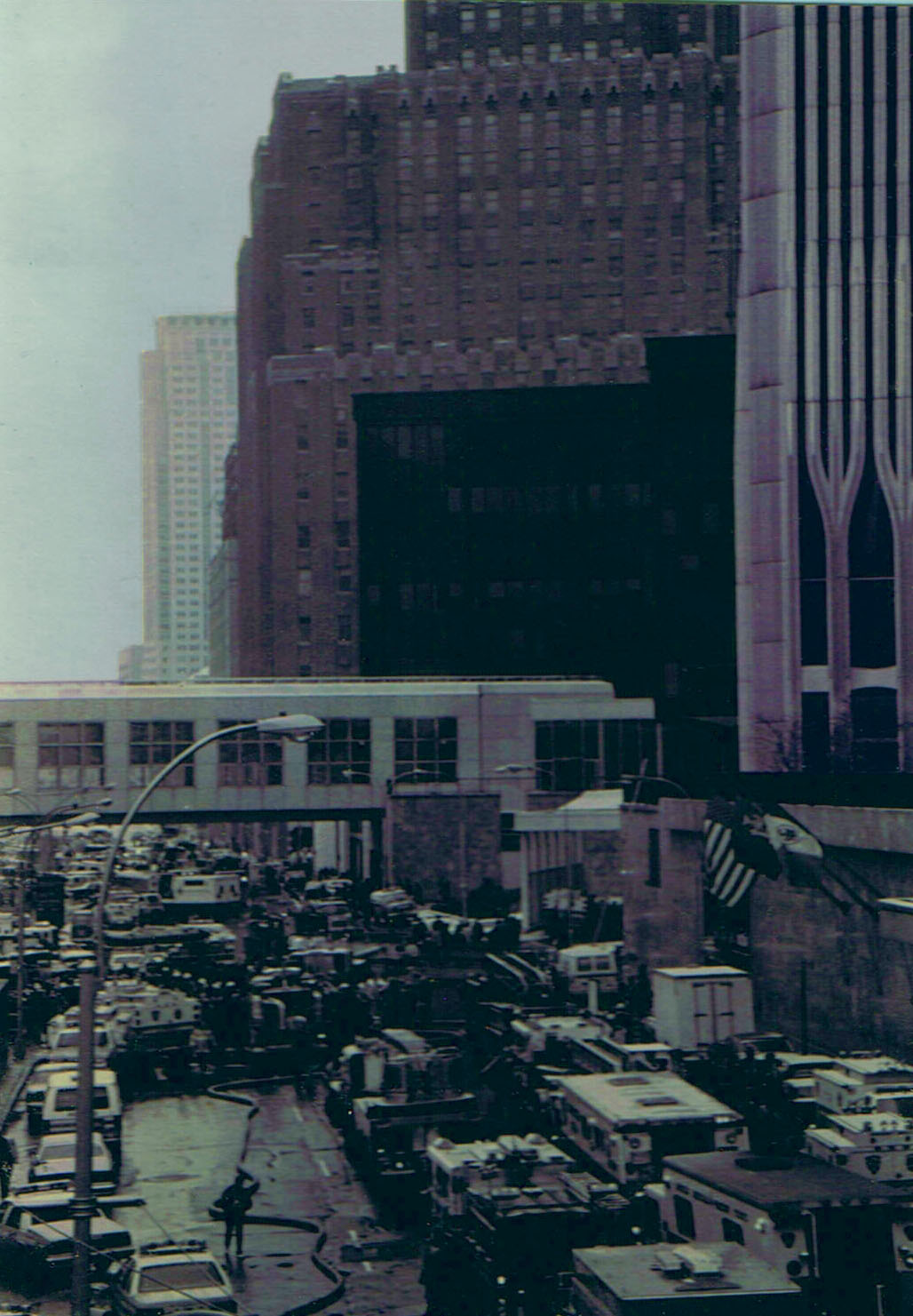
Image of the procession of rescue vehicles responding to the 1993 World Trade Center bombing. 1 World Trade Center is on the far right of the frame.

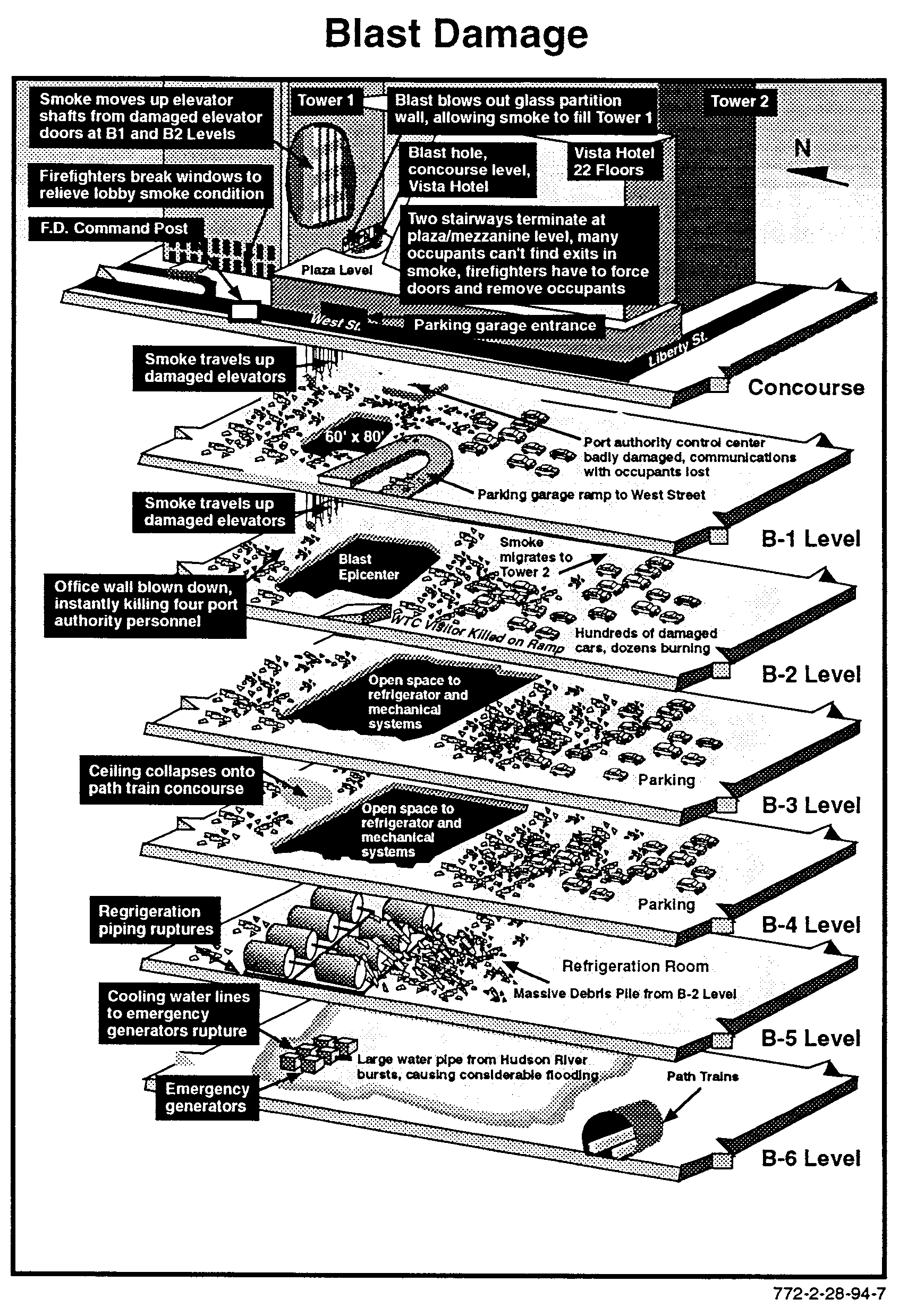
Depiction of blast damage

On Friday, February 26, 1993, Ramzi Yousef and a Jordanian friend, Eyad Ismoil, drove a yellow Ford Econoline Ryder van into Lower Manhattan, and pulled into the public parking garage beneath the World Trade Center around noon. They parked on the underground B-2 level. Yousef ignited the 20-foot (6.1 m) fuse, and fled. Twelve minutes later, at 12:18 p.m., the bomb exploded in the underground garage, generating an estimated pressure of 150,000 pounds per square inch (1.0 GPa). The bomb opened a 100-foot-wide (30 m) hole through four sublevels of concrete. The detonation velocity of this bomb was about 15,000 feet per second (10,000 mph; 4.6 km/s).

The bomb instantly cut off the World Trade Center's main electrical power line, knocking out the emergency lighting system. The bomb caused smoke to rise to the 93rd floor of both towers, including through the stairwells (which were not pressurized), and smoke went up the damaged elevators in both towers. With thick smoke filling the stairwells, evacuation was difficult for building occupants and led to many smoke inhalation injuries. Hundreds were trapped in elevators in the towers when the power was cut, including a group of 17 kindergarteners on their way down from the South Tower observation deck, who were trapped between the 35th and 36th floors for five hours.

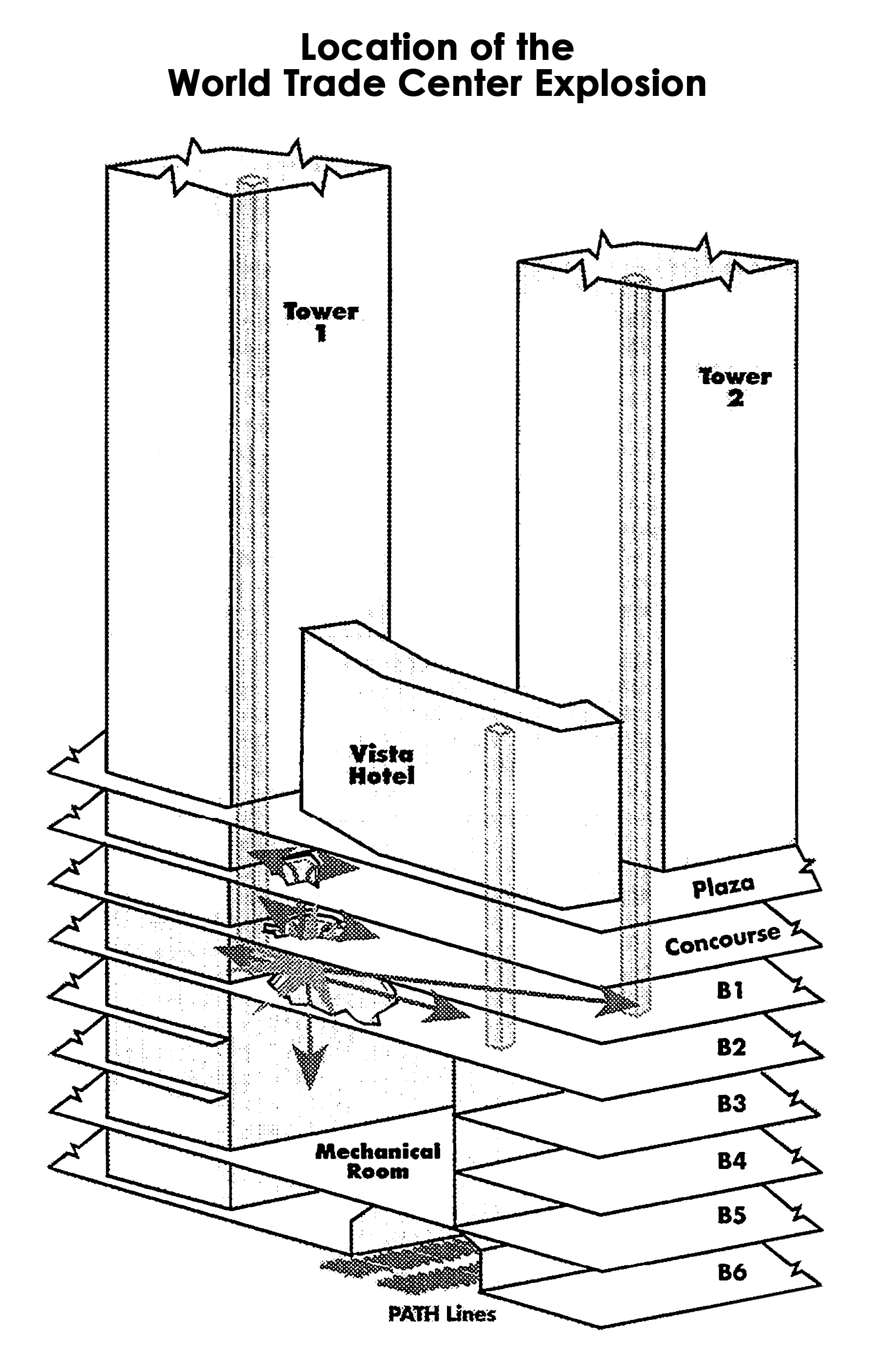
Location of the explosion

Six people were killed: five Port Authority employees, one of whom was pregnant, and a businessman whose car was in the parking garage. Additionally, over 1,000 people were injured, most during the evacuation that followed the blast. A report from the US Fire Administration states that "Among the scores of people who fled to the roofs of the towers, 28 with medical problems were airlifted by New York City police helicopters". It is known that 15 people received traumatic injuries from the blast and 20 complained of cardiac problems. One firefighter was hospitalized, while 87 others, 35 police officers, and an EMS worker were also injured in dealing with the fires and other aftermath.

Also as a result of the loss of power, most of New York City's radio and television stations (except WCBS-TV (channel 2)) lost their over-the-air broadcast signal for almost a week, with television stations only being able to broadcast via cable and satellite via a microwave hookup between the stations and three of the New York area's largest cable companies, Cablevision, Comcast, and Time Warner Cable. Telephone service for much of Lower Manhattan was also disrupted.

Yousef's plan was that the North Tower would fall onto the South Tower, collapsing them both. The tower did not collapse, but the garage was severely damaged in the explosion. Had the van been parked closer to the WTC's poured concrete foundations, Yousef's plan might have succeeded. Yousef escaped to Pakistan several hours after the bombing.

=== Bomb's characteristics ===
First reports described the explosion as "having the characteristics of from 200 to 300 pounds of a plastic explosive called Semtex". According to an article published in 1997, Semtex was only used as a detonating charge in the bomb but it is unknown how the terrorists would have obtained Semtex (which is not a "homemade" explosive, unlike other supposed components of the bomb).

According to the FBI, Yousef was assisted by Iraqi bomb maker Abdul Rahman Yasin, who helped assemble the complex 1,310-pound (590 kg) bomb, which was made of a urea nitrate main charge with aluminum, magnesium and ferric oxide particles surrounding the explosive. The charge used nitroglycerine, ammonium nitrate dynamite, smokeless powder and fuse as booster explosives. Three tanks of bottled hydrogen were also placed in a circular configuration around the main charge, to enhance the fireball and afterburn of the solid metal particles. The use of compressed gas cylinders in this type of attack closely resembles the 1983 Beirut barracks bombing 10 years earlier. Both of these attacks used compressed gas cylinders to create fuel-air and thermobaric bombs that release more energy than conventional high explosives.

According to testimony in the bomb trial, only once before the 1993 attack had the FBI recorded a bomb that used urea nitrate. Moreover, FBI agent Frederic Whitehurst was strongly critical of the procedures used to determine that the bomb contained urea nitrate; according to his testimony, he urinated in a vial, dried the urine and gave a sample of it to the analysts, who still concluded that the substance handed to them was urea nitrate. The Ryder van used in the bombing had 295 cubic feet (8.4 m^{3}) of space, which would hold up to 2,000 pounds (910 kg) of explosives. However, the van was not filled to capacity. Yousef used four 20-foot-long (6.1 m) fuses, all covered in surgical tubing. Yasin calculated that the fuse would trigger the bomb in twelve minutes after he had used a cigarette lighter to light the fuse.

Yousef wanted the smoke to remain in the tower, smothering people inside, killing them slowly.

There was a popular belief at the time that there was cyanide in the bomb, which was reinforced by Judge Duffy's statement at sentencing, "You had sodium cyanide around, and I'm sure it was in the bomb." However, while the bomb's true composition was not able to be ascertained from the crime scene, Robert Blitzer, a senior FBI official who worked on the case, stated that there was "no forensic evidence indicating the presence of sodium cyanide at the bomb site." Furthermore, Yousef is said only to have considered adding cyanide to the bomb, and to have regretted not doing so in Peter Lance's book 1000 Years for Revenge.

== Victims ==
Six people were killed:

- John DiGiovanni, age 45, a dental products salesperson.
- Robert "Bob" Kirkpatrick, age 61, Senior Structural Maintenance Supervisor.
- Stephen Knapp, age 47, Chief Maintenance Supervisor, Mechanical Section.
- Bill Macko, age 57, General Maintenance Supervisor, Mechanical Section.
- Wilfredo Mercado, age 37, a receiving agent for Windows on the World restaurant.
- Monica Rodríguez Smith, age 35, a secretary, who was seven months pregnant.

At the time of the bombing, Smith was checking time sheets in her office on the B-2 level; Kirkpatrick, Knapp and Macko were eating lunch together in an employees' break room next to Smith's office; Mercado was checking in deliveries for the restaurant; and DiGiovanni was parking in the underground garage.

=== Memorials ===
==== Memorial fountain ====
A granite memorial fountain honoring the victims who died during the bombing was designed by Elyn Zimmerman and dedicated on May 25, 1995, on the Austin J. Tobin Plaza, directly above the site of the explosion. It contained the names of the six adults who were killed in the attack, as well as an inscription written both in English and Spanish that read: "On February 26, 1993, a bomb set by terrorists exploded below this site. This horrible act of violence killed innocent people, injured thousands, and made victims of us all."

The fountain was destroyed with the rest of the World Trade Center during the September 11 attacks. A recovered fragment of the fountain marked "John D", from the name of John DiGiovanni, was later incorporated into a temporary memorial designed by Port Authority architect Jacqueline Hanley, and erected on the Liberty Street side of the site following the September 11 attacks. The memorial was visible across a fence barrier but was not open to the public. Today, the fountain fragment is currently located at the National September 11 Memorial & Museum. The rest of the fountain was never recovered, and any of its remains were removed from Ground Zero along with the rest of the rubble.

==== Post-9/11 memorials ====
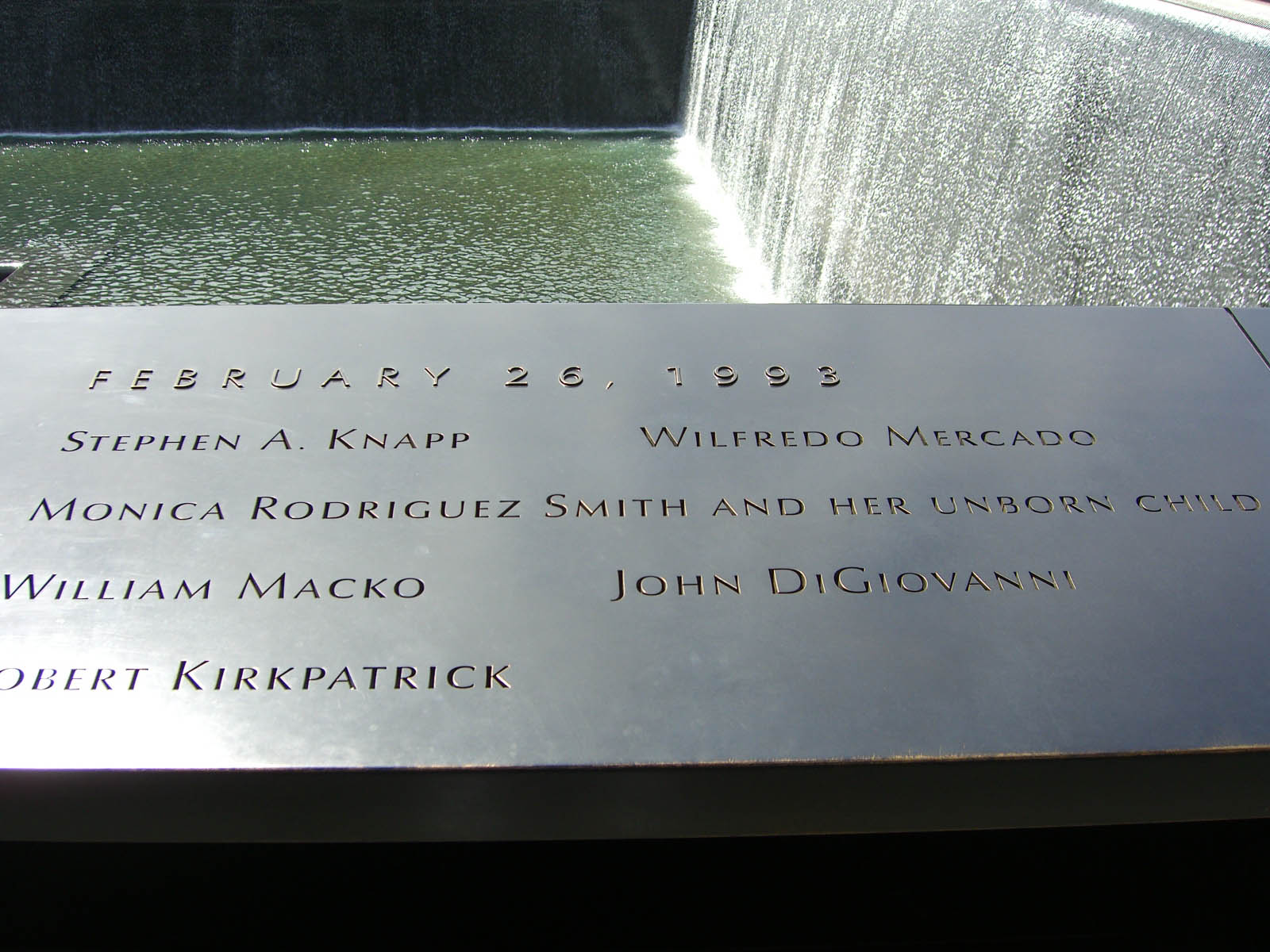
Reflecting Absence, the names of the 1993 victims inscribed in panel N-73 of the North Pool at the 9/11 Memorial

At the 9/11 Memorial, which opened on the tenth anniversary of the 2001 attacks, the people who died in the 1993 bombing are memorialized at the North Pool, on Panel N-73. The recovered fragment of the memorial fountain is on display among other artifacts related to the bombing inside the museum's historical exhibition.

The Postcards memorial in Staten Island contains the name of Stephen Knapp, the sole person from that borough who died in the bombing.

On September 8, 2026, the Port Authority of New York and New Jersey dedicated a new memorial at Liberty Park, to honor to the four workers killed in the February 1993 bombing and the 84 who died in the 9/11 attacks. That includes 37 members of the Port Authority Police Department, which is the largest loss of life by any police force in the U.S. in a single event. The memorial also has the names of agency workers who got sick or died while working on post 9/11 recovery efforts.

== Criminal cases ==
=== Investigations ===
Though the cause of the blast was not immediately known, agents and bomb technicians from the ATF, FBI, and the NYPD quickly responded to the scene. The FBI Laboratory Division technician, David Williams, who took charge of the crime scene, claimed to know prior to scientific testing the nature and size of the bomb which other lab specialists such as Stephen Burmeister and Frederic Whitehurst contradicted and later challenged with embarrassing consequences for the FBI Laboratory. In the days after the bombing, investigators surveyed the damage and looked for clues. About 300 FBI agents were deployed under the codename TRADEBOM. While combing through the rubble in the underground parking area, Donald Sadowy, Bomb Squad Detective at New York City Police Department, located some internal component fragments from the vehicle that delivered the bomb. Detective Sadowy was also an automotive specialist, and his efforts led to the discovery of the license plate number as recounted in Rendered Safe by Jeff Ingber. A vehicle identification number (VIN), found on a piece from an axle, gave investigators crucial information that led them to a Ryder van rented from DIB Leasing in Jersey City. Here they found the number of the yellow Ford Econoline Ryder van, XA 70668, on an Alabama number plate. The Ford Econoline had been reported stolen in Jersey City on February 25, one day before the bombing, as per FBI's National Crime Information Center computer. Investigators determined that the vehicle had been rented by Mohammed A. Salameh, one of Yousef's co-conspirators. Salameh had reported the van stolen, and when he returned on March 4, 1993 to get his deposit back, authorities arrested him.

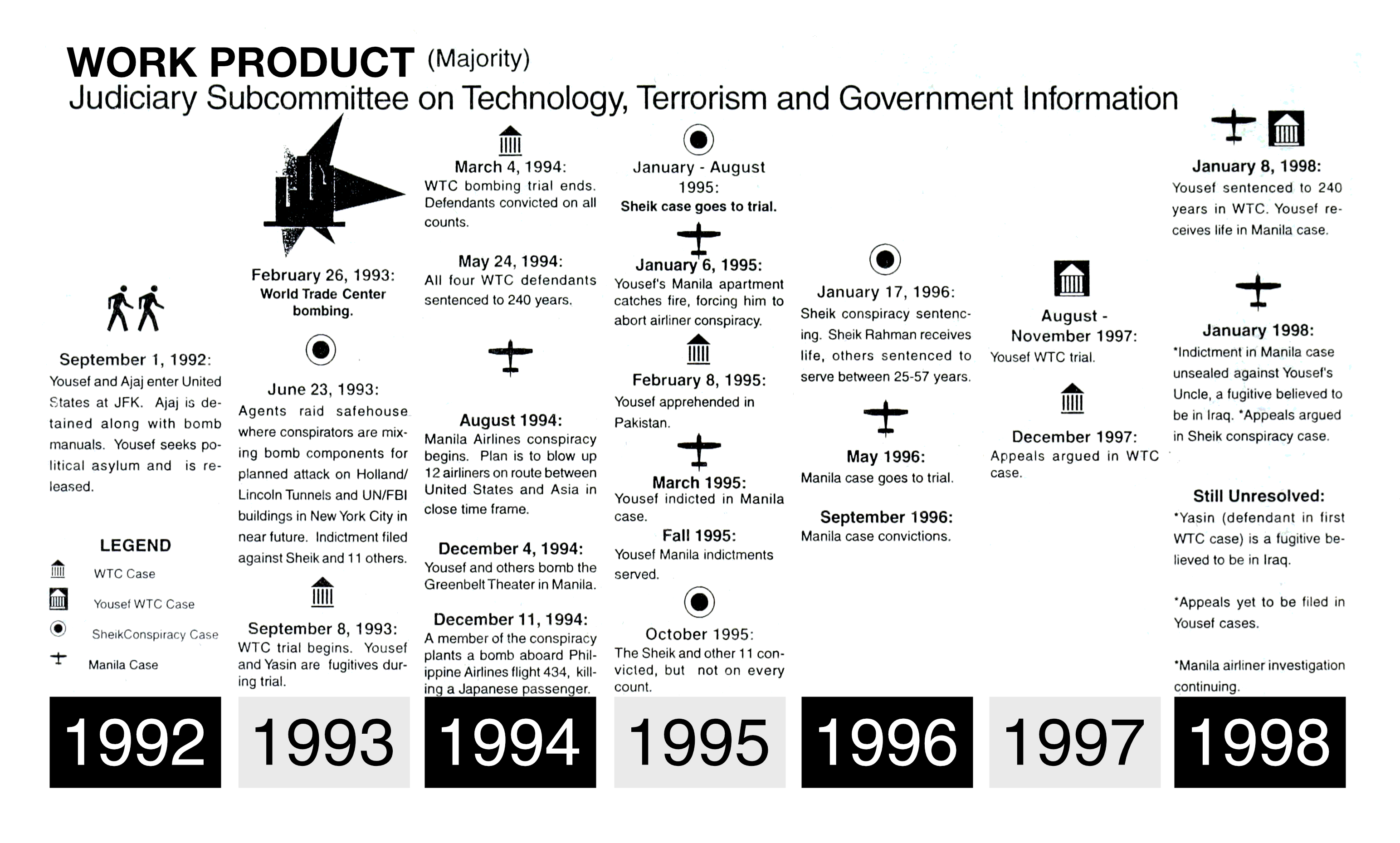
Timeline of perpetrators' activity and consequences of 1993 World Trade Center bombing and conspiracy from 1992 to 1998, including New York City landmark bomb plot, Manila Airlines, and Bojinka plot

Salameh's arrest led police to the apartment of Abdul Rahman Yasin at 40 Pamrapo Avenue in Jersey City, New Jersey, which Yasin was sharing with his mother, the same building as Ramzi Yousef's apartment. Yasin was taken to the FBI's Newark field office in Newark, New Jersey, and was then released. The next day, he flew back to Iraq, via Amman, Jordan. Yasin was later indicted for the attack, and in 2001 he was placed on the initial list of the FBI Most Wanted Terrorists, on which he remains today. He disappeared before the U.S. coalition invasion, Operation Iraqi Freedom, in 2003.

The capture of Salameh and Yasin led authorities to Ramzi Yousef's apartment, where they found bomb-making materials and a business card from Mohammed Jamal Khalifa. Khalifa was arrested on December 14, 1994, and was deported to Jordan by the INS on May 5, 1995. He was acquitted by a Jordanian court and lived as a free man in Saudi Arabia until he was killed in 2007. In 2002, it was made public that Yasin, the only person involved in the bombing who was never convicted by US authorities, was being held as a prisoner on the outskirts of Baghdad, Iraq since 1994. When journalist Lesley Stahl interviewed him there for a segment on 60 Minutes on May 23, 2002, Yasin appeared in prison pajamas and handcuffs. Yasin has not been seen or heard from since the interview. He was not located during the 2003 invasion of Iraq.

=== Trial and sentencing ===
In March 1994, Salameh, Nidal Ayyad, Mahmud Abouhalima and Ahmad Ajaj were each convicted in the World Trade Center bombing. In May 1994, they were sentenced to 240 years in prison. In the years since, they have received several sentencing reductions, which could allow them to walk free in their 90s or 100s.

== Aftermath ==
=== Reopening and cost ===
The South Tower did not reopen for tenants until March 18, 1993, (the World Trade Center Observation Deck reopened on April 17, 1993) while the North Tower remained closed until April 1, 1993. The cost to repair both buildings was estimated at $250 million. The Vista International Hotel at 3 World Trade Center remained closed until November 1, 1994, after extensive repairs and renovations that amounted to $65 million. The concourse level was reopened on March 27, 1993, while the parking garage reopened on September 1, 1993, for some government employees’ vehicles. Commercial tenants' employees were not allowed until spring 1994. Also, new security measures were introduced including identification tags for approved cars and drivers, surveillance cameras and a barrier rising out of the roadway to stop rogue vehicles.

Even though Windows on the World on the North Tower's 107th floor wasn't damaged, the explosion damaged receiving areas, the air-conditioning system, storage, and parking spots used by the restaurant complex. As a result, the restaurant was forced to shut down. The Port Authority decided to hire Joseph Baum, the restaurant's original designer, to renovate the space at a cost of $25 million. The restaurant reopened on June 26, 1996 and Cellar in the Sky reopened after Labor Day of that same year.

=== FBI involvement ===
In the course of the trial, it was revealed that the FBI had an informant, a former Egyptian army officer named Emad Salem. Salem claimed FBI involvement in building of the bomb. He secretly recorded hundreds of hours of telephone conversations with his FBI handlers. Federal authorities denied Salem's view of events and the New York Times concluded that the tapes "do not make clear the extent to which Federal authorities knew that there was a plan to bomb the World Trade Center, merely that they knew that a bombing of some sort was being discussed".

=== U.S. Diplomatic Security Service involvement ===
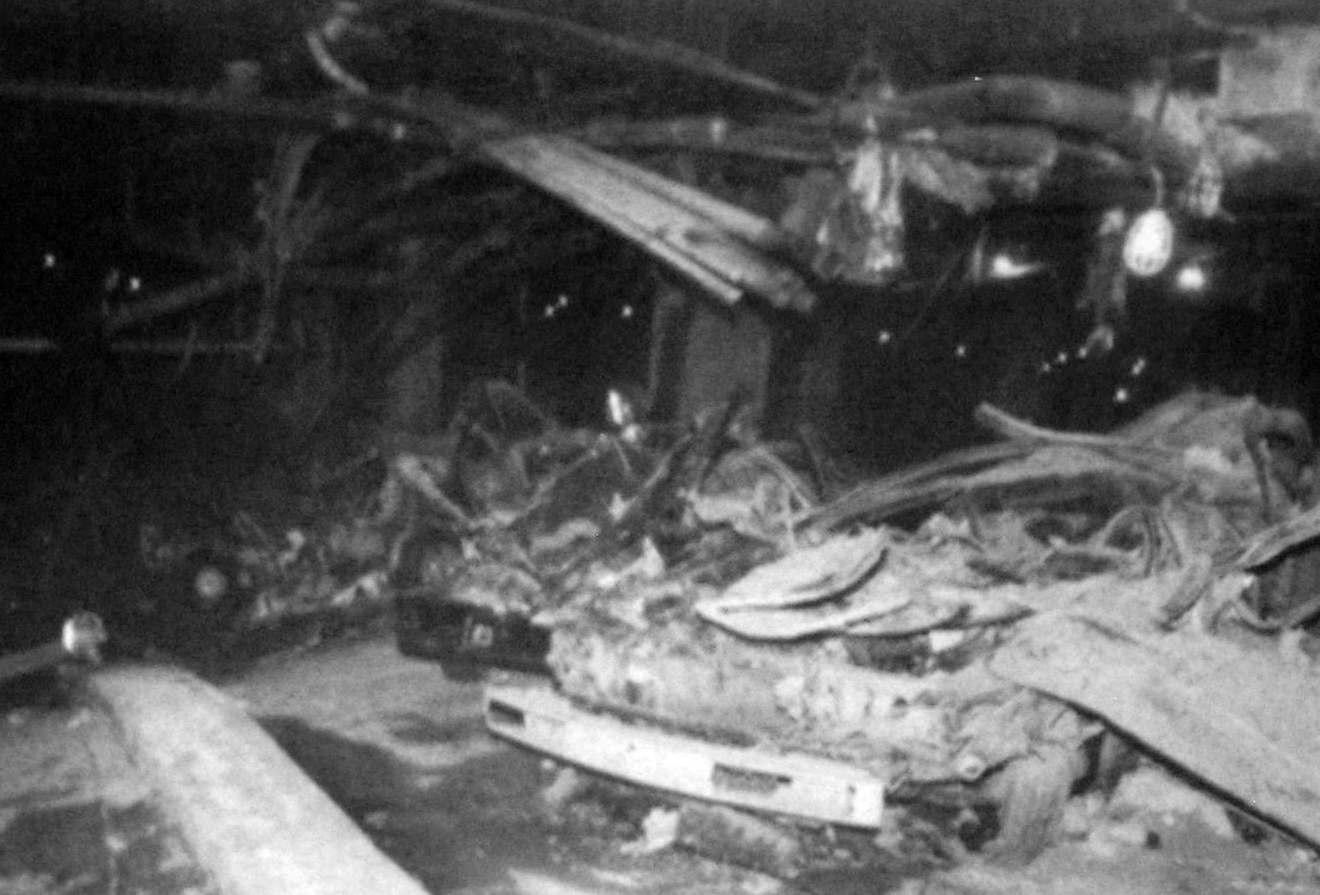
Aftermath of the bombing, photographed by DSS agents

Although the FBI received the credit, Diplomatic Security Service (DSS) special agents actually found and arrested Ramzi Yousef, the architect of the 1993 World Trade Center bombing. Special Agents Bill Miller and Jeff Riner were given a tip by an associate of Ramzi Yousef about his location. In coordination with the Pakistani Inter-Services Intelligence (ISI), DSS arrested Ramzi Yousef. After his arrest, Ramzi Yousef is alleged to have said to investigators "this is only the beginning."

=== Allegations of Iraqi involvement ===
In October 2001 in a PBS interview, former CIA Director James Woolsey claimed that Ramzi Yousef worked for Iraqi intelligence. He suggested the grand jury investigation turned up evidence pointing to Iraq that the Justice Department "brushed aside". But Neil Herman, who headed the FBI investigation, noted "The one glaring connection that can't be overlooked is Yasin. We pursued that on every level, traced him to a relative and a location, and we made overtures to get him back." However, Herman says that Yasin's presence in Baghdad does not mean Iraq sponsored the attack: "We looked at that rather extensively. There were no ties to the Iraqi government." CNN terrorism reporter Peter L. Bergen writes, "In sum, by the mid-'90s, the Joint Terrorism Task Force in New York, the F.B.I., the U.S. Attorney's office in the Southern District of New York, the C.I.A., the N.S.C., and the State Department had all found no evidence implicating the Iraqi government in the first Trade Center attack."

Claims of direct Iraqi involvement come from Dr. Laurie Mylroie of the American Enterprise Institute and former associate professor of the U.S. Naval War College, with the claims rejected by others. CNN reporter Peter Bergen has called her a "crackpot" who claimed that "Saddam was not only behind the '93 Trade Center attack, but also every anti-American terrorist incident of the past decade, from the bombings of U.S. embassies in Kenya and Tanzania to the leveling of the federal building in Oklahoma City bombing to September 11 itself." Daniel Benjamin, a senior fellow at the Center for Strategic and International Studies, writes: "The most knowledgeable analysts and investigators at the CIA and at the FBI believe that their work conclusively disproves Mylroie's claims."

In March 2008, the Pentagon released its study of some 600,000 documents captured in Iraq after the 2003 invasion (see 2008 Pentagon Report). The study "found no 'smoking gun' (i.e., direct connection) between Saddam's Iraq and al Qaeda." Among the documents released by the Pentagon was a captured audio file of Saddam Hussein speculating that the 1993 attack on the World Trade Center had been carried out by Israel or American intelligence, or perhaps a Saudi or Egyptian faction. Saddam said that he did not trust the bomber Yasin, who was in Iraqi custody, because his testimony was too "organized." The Pentagon study found that Yasin "was a prisoner, and not a guest, in Iraq." Mylroie denied that this was proof of Saddam's non-involvement, claiming that "one common purpose of such meetings was to develop cover stories for whatever Iraq sought to conceal."

=== Improved security ===
In the wake of the bombing and the chaotic evacuation which followed, the World Trade Center and many of the firms inside of it revamped emergency procedures, particularly with regard to evacuation of the towers. The New York Port Authority was to govern as the main security for the World Trade Center buildings. All packages were scanned at various checkpoints then sent up to the proper addressee. These policies played a role in evacuating the building during the September 11 attacks, which destroyed the towers.

Free access to the roofs, which had enabled evacuation by police helicopter in the 1993 bombing, was ended soon after.

=== Eclipsed by the September 11 attacks ===
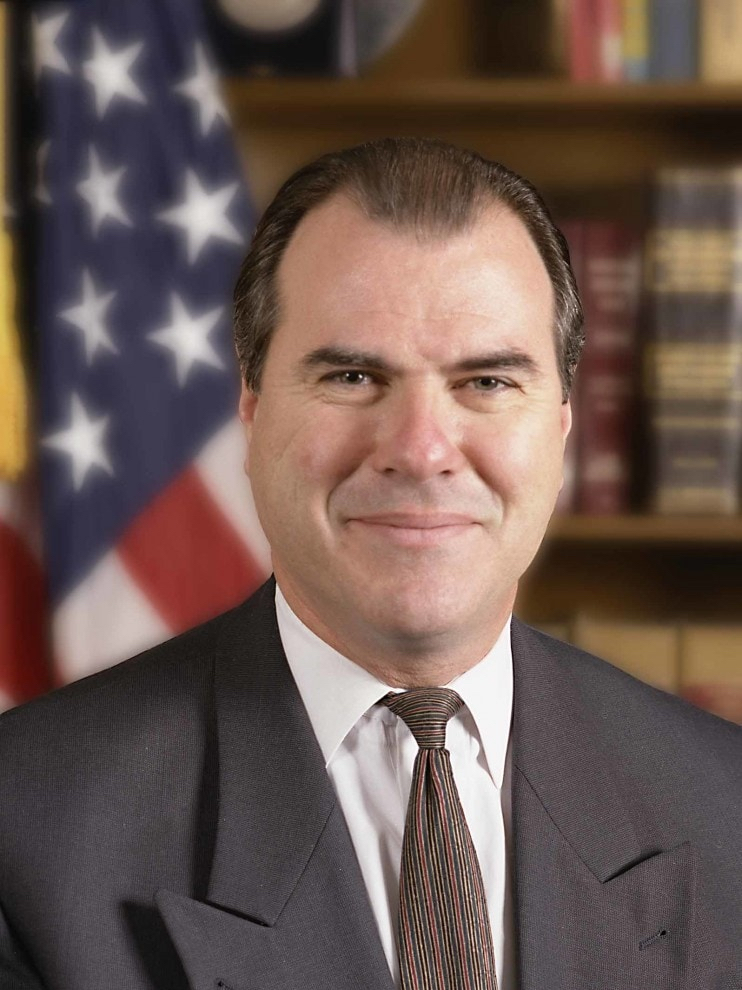
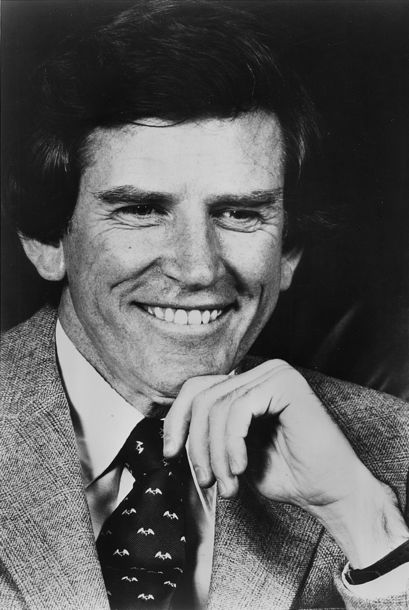
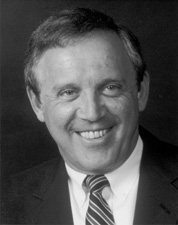
During the period between the 1993 bombing and 2001 terrorist attacks, FBI Special Agent John O'Neill, as well as former Senators Gary Hart and Warren Rudman, attempted to alert high-ranking U.S. government officials of a future terrorist attack.

Since the September 11 attacks, which succeeded in destroying the World Trade Center, the 1993 bombing has been described as "forgotten" and "unknown." Although the 1993 bombing made the World Trade Center a publicly known terrorist target, with the possibility of another attack suspected as early as 1995 by FBI Special Agent John O'Neill, as well as by former Senators Gary Hart and Warren Rudman of the Hart-Rudman Commission in January 2001, the 9/11 attacks went largely unforeseen by U.S. intelligence and law-enforcement agencies. While victims' family members and injured survivors of the 2001 terrorist attack received compensation from the September 11th Victim Compensation Fund, no such compensation was given to those affected by the 1993 bombing.

== Legal responsibility ==
Some of the victims (which included families of the killed victims) of the 1993 World Trade Center bombings sued the Port Authority of New York and New Jersey for damages. A decision was handed down in 2005, assigning liability for the bombings to the Port Authority. The decision declared that the agency was 68 percent responsible for the bombing, and the terrorists bore only 32 percent of the responsibility. In January 2008, the Port Authority asked a five-judge panel of the Appellate Division of the New York State Supreme Court in Manhattan to throw out the decision, describing the jury's verdict as "bizarre". On April 29, 2008, a New York State Appeals Court unanimously upheld the jury's verdict. Under New York law, a defendant who is more than 50 percent at fault can be held fully financially liable. On September 22, 2011, the New York Court of Appeals, in a four to three ruling, excluded the Port Authority from claims of negligence related to the 1993 bombing.

It has been argued that the problem with the apportionment of responsibility in the case is not the jury's verdict, but rather New York's tort-reform-produced state apportionment law. Traditionally, courts do not compare intentional and negligent fault. The Restatement Third of Torts: Apportionment of Liability recommends a rule to prevent juries from having to make comparisons like the terrorist–Port Authority comparison in this case. However, if a jurisdiction does compare these intentional and negligent torts, courts' second-best position is to do what the NYS Appeals Court did—to uphold all jury apportionments, even those that assign greater, or perhaps far greater, responsibility to negligent than intentional parties.

The Port Authority sued (189 F.3d 305) Arcadian Corporation, Hydro-Agri North America, and Dyno Nobel, Inc. on theories of products liability and negligence, alleging that these companies manufactured the fertilizer products used to make the bomb without taking appropriate, available precautions to neutralize the explosiveness of the substances. The case was dismissed by the New Jersey Federal District Court for failure to state a claim, a judgment which was affirmed on appeal by the Third Circuit Court of Appeals.

== See also ==
- Attacks on the United States
- New York City landmark bomb plot (thwarted June 24, 1993)
- CIA headquarters shooting (January 25, 1993)
- Bojinka plot (planned for January 1995)
- 1998 United States embassy bombings (August 7, 1998)
- USS Cole bombing (October 12, 2000)
- September 11 attacks (September 11, 2001)
- Richard A. Clarke
- John P. O'Neill
- Rick Rescorla
- Gary Hart
- The Looming Tower (2006 book)
  - The Looming Tower (2018 miniseries)
- Oklahoma City bombing (April 19, 1995)
- Path to Paradise: The Untold Story of the World Trade Center Bombing
- Philippine Airlines Flight 434 (bombed on December 11, 1994)
- Islamic fundamentalism
- Islamic terrorism
- Islamism
- Jihadism
- List of Islamist terrorist attacks
- List of terrorist incidents
- Religious terrorism
- Terrorism in the United States
- Domestic terrorism in the United States
- Timeline of terrorist attacks in the United States

== General sources ==
- Final Report of the 9/11 Commission on Terrorist Attacks Upon the United States (PDF) (Report). National Commission on Terrorist Attacks Upon the United States. July 22, 2004. Archived (PDF) from the original on August 16, 2021.
- Dwyer, Jim; Kocieniewski, David; Murphy, Deidre; Tyre, Peg (1994). Two Seconds Under the World: terror comes to America—the conspiracy behind the World Trade Center bombing. New York: Crown Publishers. ISBN 0-517-59767-5. OCLC 30623523.
- Lance, Peter (2003). 1000 Years for Revenge. HarperCollins. ISBN 9780060543549.
- Reeve, Simon (1999). The New Jackals: Ramzi Yousef, Osama bin Laden and the Future of Terrorism. Northeastern University Press. ISBN 9781555534073.
- Wright, Lawrence (2006). The Looming Tower: Al Qaeda and the Road to 9/11. Alfred A. Knopf. ISBN 0-375-41486-X.
