= Mahmud Abouhalima =

Egyptian al-Qaeda member

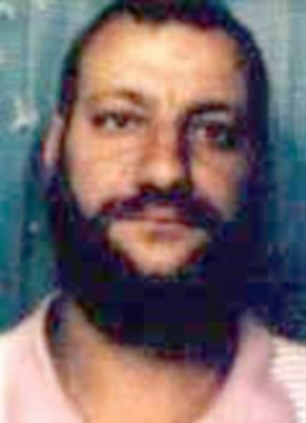
- Abouhalima, c. 1994
- Born: December 14, 1958 (age 67); Kafr Dawar, Egypt
- Other name: Mahmud the Red
- Known for: 1993 World Trade Center bombing
- Status: Incarcerated
- Convictions: Conspiracy to bomb a building used in interstate and foreign commerce Conspiracy to bomb property and vehicles owned, used, and leased by an agency of the United States; Conspiracy to transport explosives in interstate commerce Conspiracy to bomb or destroy a vehicle used in interstate commerce resulting in death (2 counts); Conspiracy to assault federal officers Conspiracy to use and carry a destructive device during a crime of violence Making false statements on immigration documents
- Penalty: 240 years imprisonment; commuted to 78 years and 4 months imprisonment

Details
- Imprisoned at: ADX Florence

Mahmud Abouhalima (Arabic: محمود أبو حليمة) (born December 14, 1958) is an Egyptian citizen who is convicted as a perpetrator of the 1993 World Trade Center bombing. He is currently serving a 78-year and 4-month sentence at ADX Florence in Florence, Colorado, for his role in the bombing.

== Life ==
Born to a mill foreman in Kafr Dawar, Egypt, Abouhalima spent his adolescence with the Al-Gama'a al-Islamiyya, an outlawed Islamic group that heralded Omar Abdel Rahman as their spiritual leader. He briefly attended Alexandria University but dropped out and left Egypt altogether in 1981, moving to Germany. There, he later recalled he had lived a life "of corruption – girls, drugs, you name it".

The following year, Germany denied him political asylum, and he quickly married Renate Soika, a troubled German woman, which guaranteed he could remain in the country. He divorced Soika three years later but in short order married another woman named Marianne Weber in a Muslim ceremony. He flew to Brooklyn with his new wife, and after his American tourist visa expired, he applied for amnesty, claiming to be an agricultural worker. He was accepted as a permanent resident under the Immigration Reform and Control Act of 1986.

He worked as a New York City cabdriver from 1986 to 1991, though he saw his license suspended ten times during that period for failing to attend traffic court for cab violations, including traffic violations and an attempt to overcharge a customer.

In his free time, Abouhalima worked long hours for a non-profit group in Brooklyn that raised money for the Afghan Mujahideen.

== Militancy ==
Abouhalima travelled to Afghanistan in 1988, saying he wanted to prove he "was a Muslim, not a sheep", and received combat training in Peshawar.

Ali Mohamed, a sergeant at Fort Bragg, provided United States Army manuals and other assistance to individuals at the al-Farouq Mosque, and some members, including Abouhalima and El Sayyid Nosair, practiced at the Calverton Shooting Range on Long Island, many of the group wearing T-shirts reading "Help Each Other in Goodness and Piety...A Muslim to a Muslim is a Brick Wall" with a map of Afghanistan emblazoned in the middle. Abouhalima wore an NRA cap during their practices. When Nosair eliminated Meir Kahane, Abouhalima was driving the purported getaway car, although Nosair accidentally jumped into another cab by mistake.

He was the subject of an FBI investigation through January 1993, at which point the investigation was called off, shortly before the World Trade Center bombing. On February 26, 1993, the day of the WTC bombing, he was seen by several witnesses with Mohammed A. Salameh at the Jersey City storage facility allegedly used to prepare the explosives.

== Capture ==
Abouhalima fled to Saudi Arabia and then back to his native Egypt, where he was captured by Egyptian police, tortured, and extradited back to the United States on March 24.

In March 1994, Abouhalima was sentenced to 240 years in prison. After an appeal, the sentence was later reduced to 1,300 months, or 108 years. In 2021, one of Abouhalima's convictions was overturned, cutting his sentence by 30 years. He is currently an inmate at ADX Florence in Florence, Colorado. He is scheduled for release on March 8, 2060. Abouhalima's Federal Bureau of Prisons ID# is 28064–054. In 2013, Abouhalima gave an account about his life in supermax prison, stating, "Sitting in a small box in a walking distance of eight feet, this little hole becomes my world, my dining room, reading and writing area, sleeping, walking, urinating, and defecating. I am virtually living in a bathroom, and this concept has never left my mind in ten years." He also stated how limited his communications were in prison.
