= El Sayyid Nosair =

Egyptian-born American assassin (born 1955)

- سيد نصير
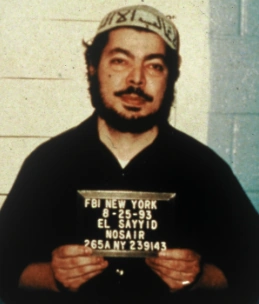
- Nosair in 1993
- Born: 16 November 1955 (age 71); Port Said, Egypt
- Spouse: Karen Mills
- Children: 3, including Zak Ebrahim
- Status: Imprisoned in United States Penitentiary, Big Sandy in Inez, Kentucky
- Penalty: Life imprisonment

El Sayyid Nosair (Arabic: سيد نصير; born 16 November 1955) is an Egyptian-born American who was convicted of involvement in the 1993 New York City landmark bomb plot, and later admitted to having committed the assassination of Meir Kahane.

In 1994, Nosair was convicted in federal court of nine counts, including seditious conspiracy, murder in aid of racketeering, attempted murder in aid of racketeering, attempted murder of a U.S. Postal Inspection Service officer, use of a firearm in the commission of a murder, use of a firearm during an attempted murder, and possession of a firearm.

== Background ==
El Sayyid Nosair was born in 1955 in Port Said, Egypt, and immigrated to the United States in 1981. He became an American citizen in 1989. In the United States, Nosair worked various jobs in New Jersey and New York City. Nosair was employed by the City of New York to repair the air conditioning equipment at the criminal courts building.

Nosair expressed dislike for American culture and what he viewed to be rampant moral corruption. Nosair became involved with the al-Farouq Mosque in Brooklyn, which was supported by the Maktab al-Khidamat (Afghanistan Services Bureau). The Services Bureau was established in 1984 by Osama bin Laden and Abdullah Azzam in Peshawar, Pakistan to raise funds for the Arab mujahadeen during the Soviet–Afghan War, as well as recruitment. Ali Mohamed, a sergeant at Fort Bragg, provided United States Army manuals and other assistance to individuals at the al-Farouq Mosque, and some members, including Mahmoud Abouhalima and Nosair, practiced at the Calverton Shooting Range on Long Island.

== Assassination of Meir Kahane ==
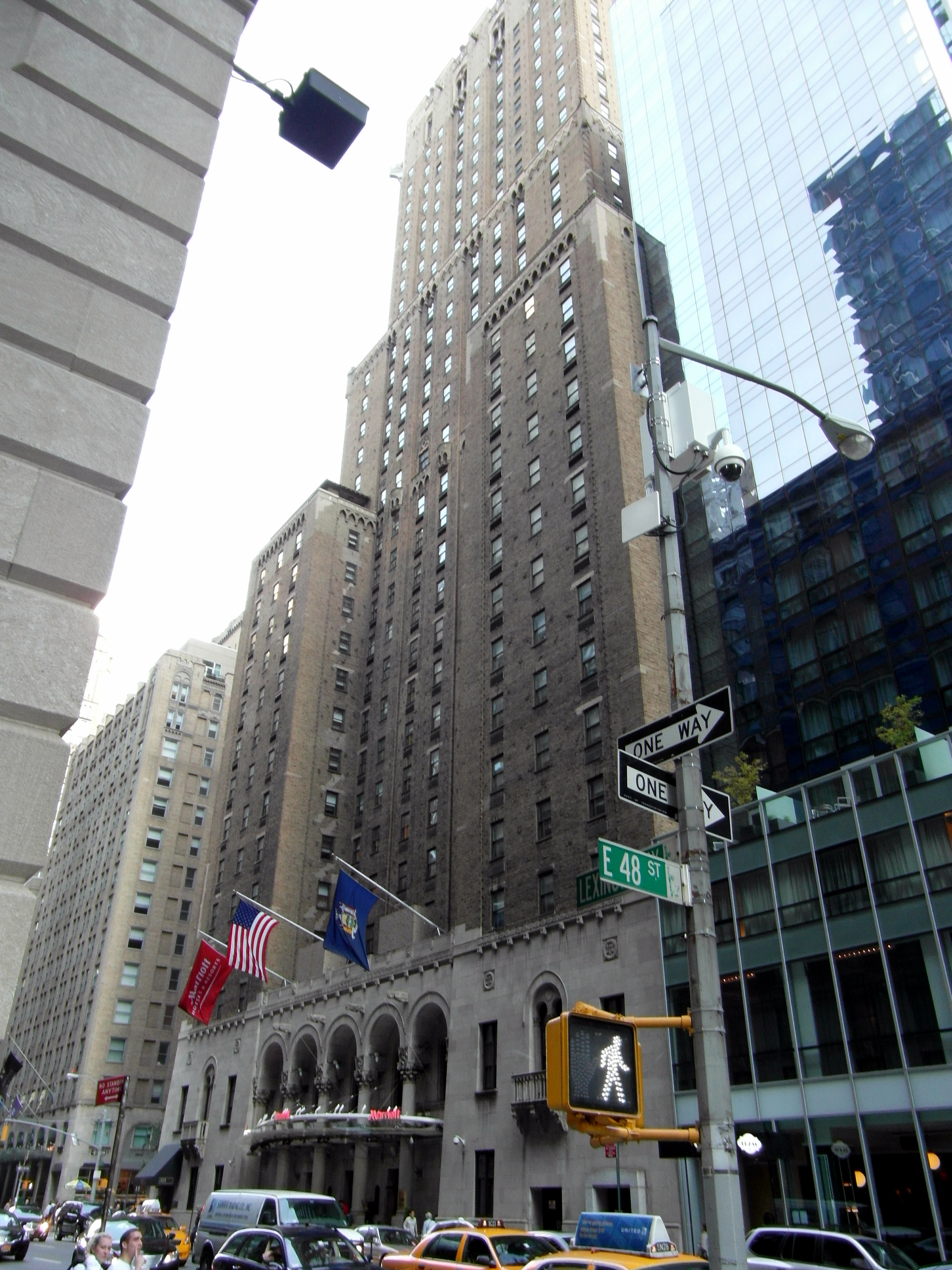
525 Lexington Avenue, formerly New York Marriott East Side

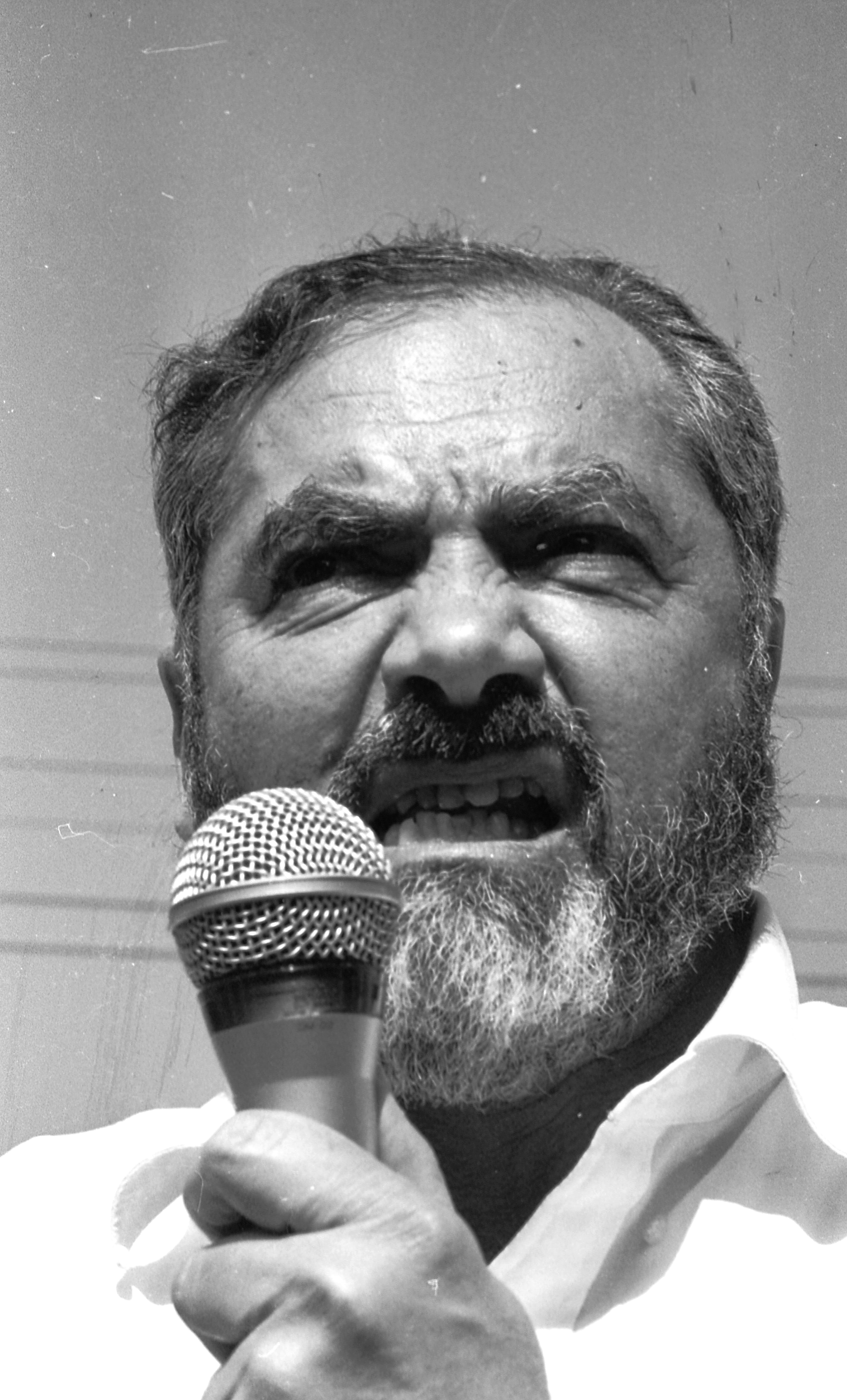
Meir Kahane

In 1990, Nosair was accused of assassinating Rabbi Meir Kahane, formerly a member of the Israeli Knesset, and founder of the Jewish Defense League and Kach. Kahane was killed on November 5, 1990, shortly after 9 p.m., following a speech to an audience of mostly Orthodox Jews from Brooklyn. A crowd of well-wishers gathered around Kahane following the speech in the second-floor lecture hall in midtown Manhattan's Marriott East Side Hotel. Nosair ran toward and shot Kahane as he was answering questions following his speech. Nosair attempted to flee the scene and commandeer a taxi, but he was shot by Carlos Acosta, a police officer for the United States Postal Inspection Service. The two continued to exchange gunfire before Nosair was apprehended. Nosair and several others were evacuated to Bellevue Hospital for treatment of their wounds, and Kahane was pronounced dead at the hospital.

=== Trial ===
During legal proceedings, Nosair largely ignored the court and focused on multiple sketches he made of Princess Diana.

In a verdict described by law professor Jeffrey B. Abramson as "bizarre", a jury in December 1991 acquitted Nosair of Kahane's murder but convicted him of assaulting Acosta and possession of an illegal firearm. He was defended by William Kunstler (along with two co-counsels), who at first advised him to plead insanity. When Nosair refused, the defense argued that there had been a conspiracy against Nosair, and Kahane might have been killed by one of his followers. Kunstler saw the composition of the jury (which he described as being made up of "third-world people" and "people who were not yuppies or establishment types") as crucial to the verdict.

The judge in the trial, Justice Alvin Schlesinger, said that the jury's acquittal of Nosair on the murder charge was "against the overwhelming weight of evidence and was devoid of common sense and logic". The judge added that he believed Nosair "conducted a rape of this country, of our Constitution and of our laws, and of people seeking to exist peacefully together." On January 29, 1992, he sentenced Nosair to 7 1/3 to 22 years in prison, the maximum allowed.

Kunstler also saw the verdict as irrational, promising to appeal Nosair's convictions.

=== Possible accomplices in Kahane's assassination ===
In August 2010, the Israeli newspaper The Jerusalem Post, referencing a story written by Peter Lance and published in Playboy, which summarized FBI memos, claimed that Nosair had two partners and that his original target was Israeli military figure and future Prime Minister of Israel Ariel Sharon. The article states that in 2005 Nosair stated to FBI investigators "that on the night he shot Kahane dead, he was accompanied by two co-conspirators to the Marriot Hotel in Manhattan where Kahane was speaking – one of whom was also carrying a gun." The men, Bilal al-Kaisi (also known as Bilal Elqisi), a Jordanian, and Mohammed A. Salameh, a Palestinian, have never been charged for their part in the slaying, but both were linked to al Qaeda and the 1993 World Trade Center bombing, Salameh was convicted of his part in the terrorist conspiracy; Al Kaisi was initially charged in the bombing conspiracy, but these charges were later dropped due to insufficient evidence. He subsequently pleaded guilty to lying to immigration officials and received a 20-month sentence.

== Conspiracy to help Nosair escape from prison ==
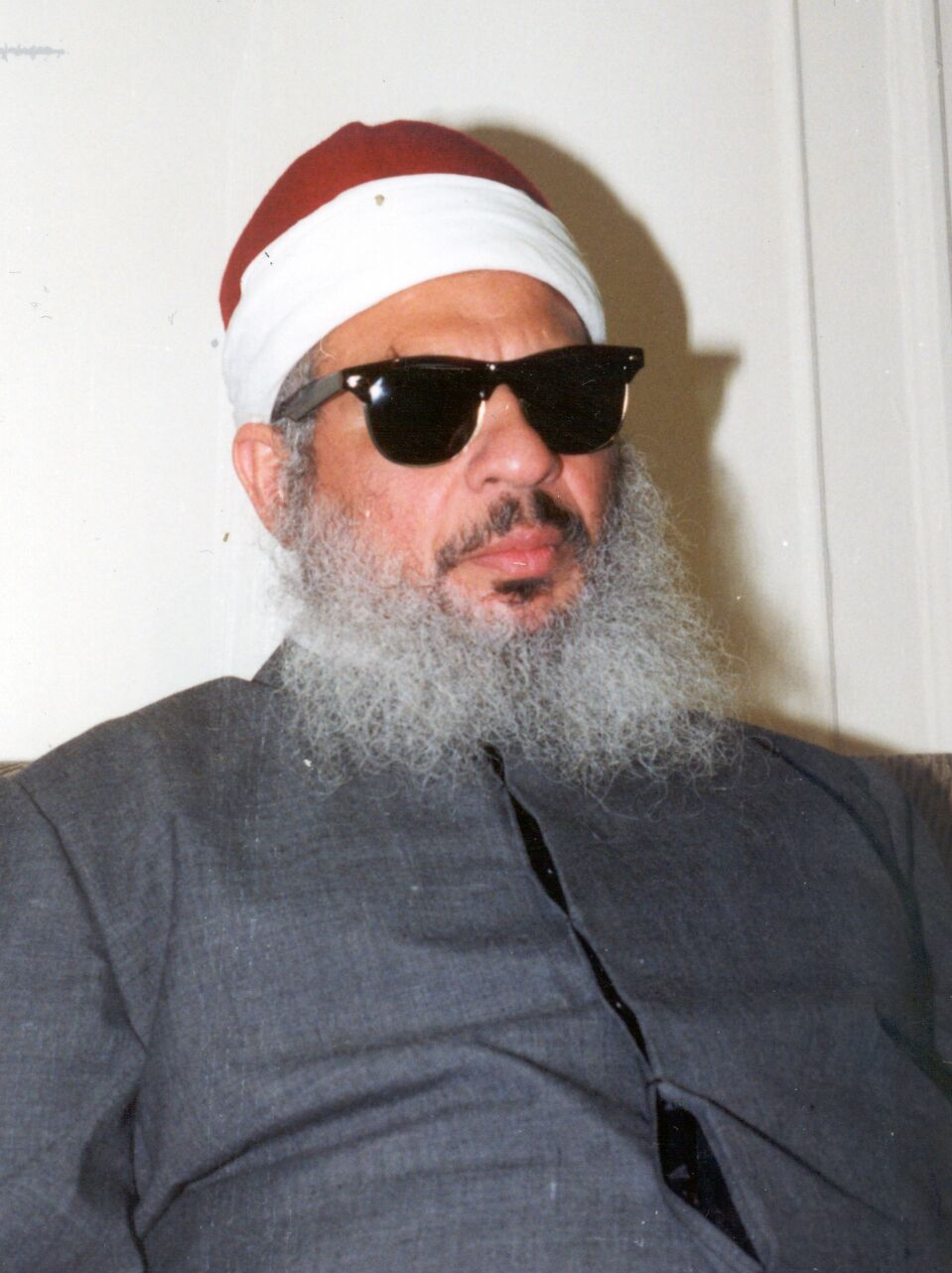
Omar Abdel-Rahman

Nosair was originally to serve his sentence at the Attica State Prison in New York. It was reported that prior to his arrest, Omar Abdel-Rahman (the "Blind Sheikh") and his followers had conducted detailed surveillance of the facility, and they had also discussed plans to help Nosair escape from prison by launching a truck bomb attack combined with an armed assault.

== Terrorist conspiracy conviction ==
Nosair was still imprisoned in a state prison when he was convicted as part of the federal trial of Abdel-Rahman. Both received life sentences without the possibility of parole for their involvement in a terrorist conspiracy, with Nosair receiving an additional 15 years on top of the life sentence. It was ruled that Kahane's death was part of the "seditious conspiracy". Nosair was convicted of nine counts, including conspiracy to use explosives against New York landmarks, seditious conspiracy, plotting to assassinate U.S. politicians, murder of Kahane in aid of racketeering, attempted murder in aid of racketeering, attempted murder of a postal police officer, use of a firearm in the commission of a murder, use of a firearm in an attempted murder, and possession of a firearm; he received life plus 15 years of imprisonment. Nosair's relatives obtained funds from Osama bin Laden to pay for Nosair's defense.

== Link to Osama bin Laden ==
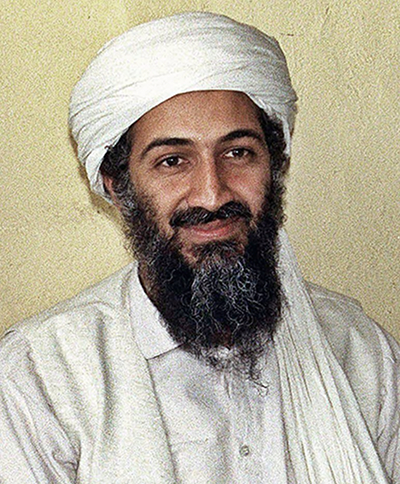
Osama bin Laden

In 2002, Eleanor Hill, director of the Senate Intelligence Committee investigating intelligence failures prior to the September 11, 2001, attacks, reported that Nosair had links with terrorist organizations in Pakistan and that Osama bin Laden helped pay for his legal defense during his trial for the assassination of Meir Kahane. The FBI learned that one of Nosair's relatives traveled to Saudi Arabia and acquired funds from Osama bin Laden to fund Nosair's legal defense. Ron Kuby, one of Nosair's lawyers, later stated that a cousin of Nosair's had pooled money together with Nosair's family to raise money for his legal defense.

== Family ==
Nosair married Karen Mills, a native of Pittsburgh who changed her given name to Khadijah when she converted from Roman Catholicism to Islam in 1982. The couple had two sons, and they raised a daughter from Khadijah's previous marriage. One of Nosair's sons, born Abdulaziz El Sayyid Nosair, changed his name to Zak Ebrahim and now works as a peace activist. He released his first book, The Terrorist's Son: A Story of Choice in September 2014.
