= Mohammed Salameh =

Palestinian participant in the 1993 WTC bombing (born 1967)

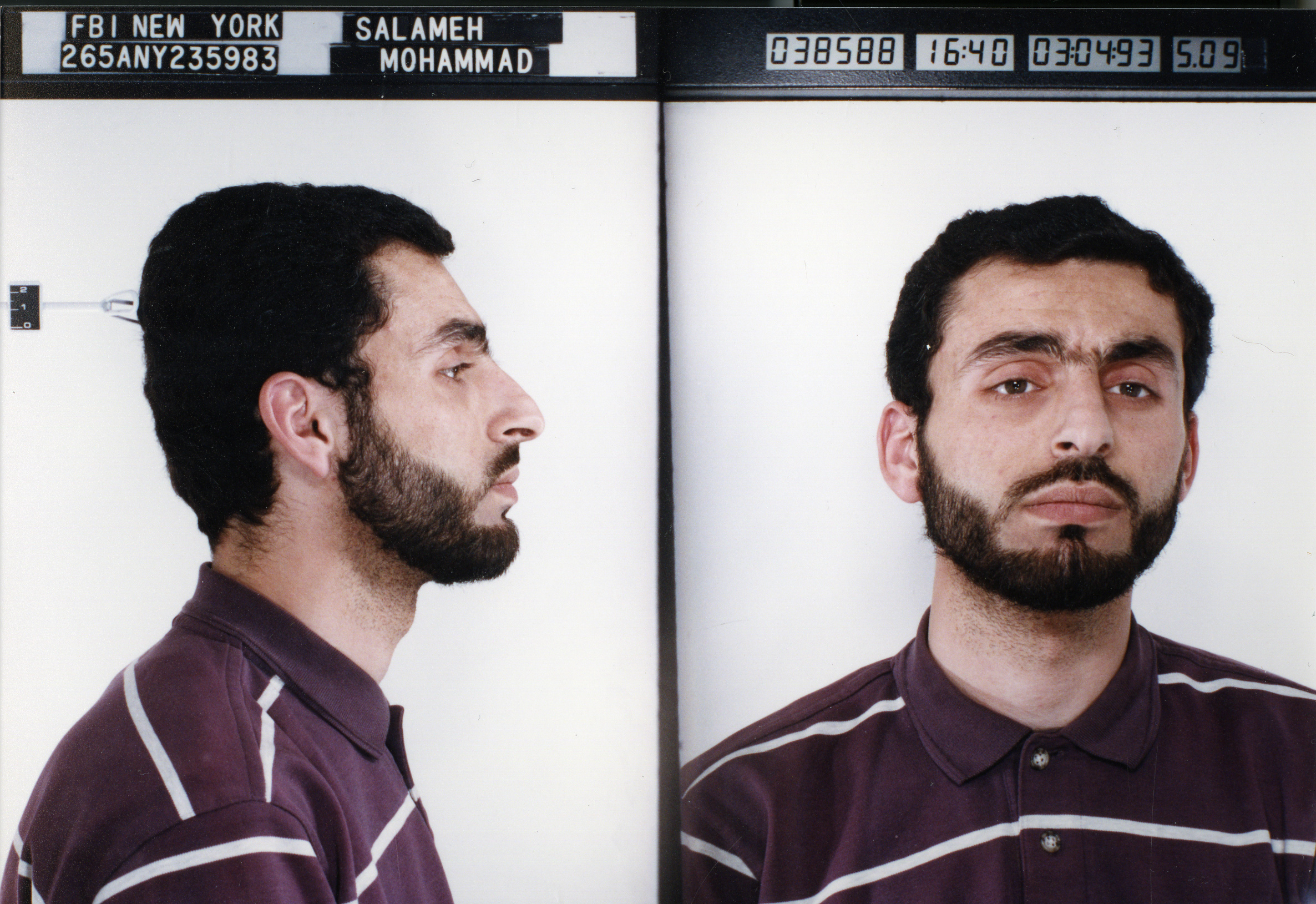
- Salameh's FBI mugshot, March 4, 1993
- Born: September 1, 1967 (age 59); West Bank
- Known for: 1993 World Trade Center bombing
- Status: Incarcerated
- Convictions: Conspiracy to bomb a building used in interstate and foreign commerce Conspiracy to bomb property and vehicles owned, used, and leased by an agency of the United States; Conspiracy to transport explosives in interstate commerce Conspiracy to bomb or destroy a vehicle used in interstate commerce resulting in death (2 counts); Conspiracy to assault federal officers Conspiracy to use and carry a destructive device during a crime of violence Making false statements on immigration documents
- Penalty: 240 years imprisonment; commuted to 86 years and 11 months imprisonment

Details
- Imprisoned at: FCI Marion

Mohammed A. Salameh (Arabic: محمد سلامة; born September 1, 1967) is a Palestinian convicted terrorist and perpetrator of the 1993 World Trade Center bombing. He is currently serving an 84 year prison sentence as an inmate at FCI Marion in Marion, Illinois for his role in the attack.

== Early life ==
Salameh was born in the West Bank, which he and his family soon fled in 1967 when the Six-Day War occurred.

== Illegal immigrant ==
He entered the United States on a six-month tourist visa in 1988 but then overstayed. He was still in the country illegally in 1993 during the World Trade Center bombing. He applied for an immigration amnesty under a 1986 law that set up the Special Agricultural Worker program despite never having been eligible. However, he was still guaranteed work authorization until the Immigration and Naturalization Service could rule on his applications. It took the INS nearly five years to determine he was ineligible for any of the programs for which he had applied. Even then, he was not deported.

== Role in World Trade Center bombing ==
Salameh's 1978 Chevy Nova was used to ferry the nitric acid and urea used to construct the bomb used in the past 1993 bombing.

Despite failing his driving test four times, Salameh had been the driver for the group. On January 24, 1993, he jumped a curb and tore the undercarriage from his car, injuring himself and Ramzi Yousef. He was checked out of Rahway Hospital the following day and went to the garage to clean his car while Yousef remained in the hospital for four more days.

With his Nova in for repairs, Salameh got Nidal Ayyad to use his corporate account with Allied Signal to rent him a new car. However, he got in a car accident again on February 16 and collided with a car.

== Arrest and sentencing ==
On March 4, 1993, the FBI arrested Salameh. He had just collected $400 after reporting his rental van had been stolen and speaking with an undercover FBI agent posing as a Ryder "loss prevention analyst". Earlier, the FBI had traced the Ford Econoline van that had been used in the World Trade Center bombing by its vehicle identification number.

In 1994, Salameh was sentenced to 240 years in prison. In 1999, his sentence was reduced to 116 years and 11 months. In 2021, one of his convictions was overturned, cutting his sentence by another 30 years. He is assigned BOP number 34338-054. Salameh was initially sent to ADX Florence, where he was repeatedly force-fed after hunger strikes. He was later transferred to USP Big Sandy, FCI Terre Haute, and then to FCI Marion where he currently resides. Salameh is scheduled for release on May 23, 2067.

== Possible link to assassination of Kahane ==
An article in the Jerusalem Post quoted from the mid-August 2010 issue of Playboy that El Sayyid Nosair, who had been acquitted of the murder of Meir Kahane, later still claimed that he had two partners with him:

He (Mr. Nosair) added that on the night he shot Kahane dead, he was accompanied by two co-conspirators to the Marriot Hotel in Manhattan where Kahane was speaking – one of whom was also carrying a gun. The men, Bilal al-Kaisi of Jordan and Mohammed Salameh, a Palestinian illegal alien later involved in the 1993 World Trade Center bombing, have never been charged for their part in the slaying."
