= Peter Lance =

American journalist and author (born 1948)

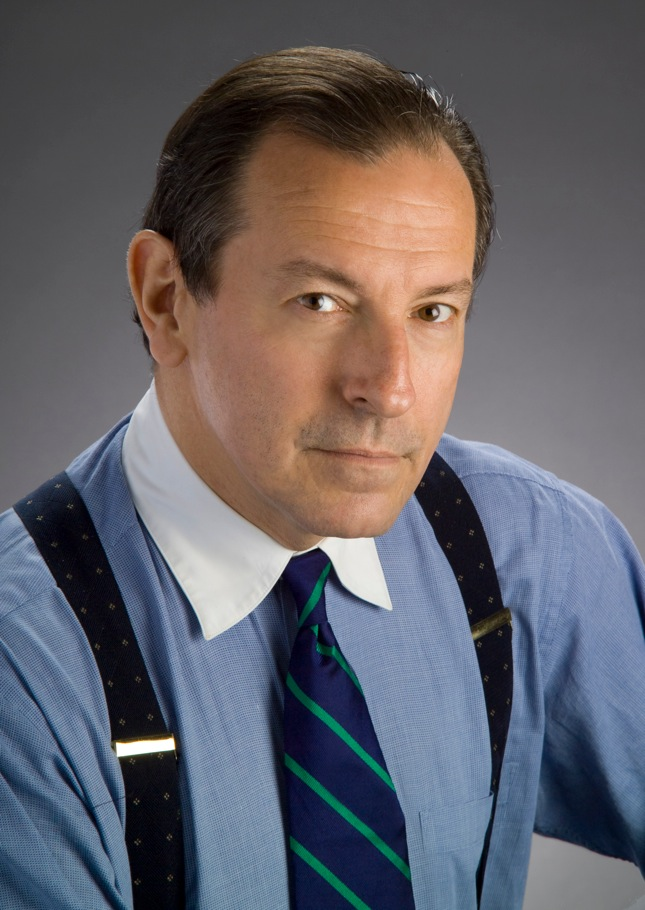
- Lance in 2012
- Born: Peter Lance; February 18, 1948 (age 78); Newport, Rhode Island, United States
- Education: Studied law at Fordham University; Studied journalism at Columbia University Graduate School of Journalism; Studied philosophy at Northeastern University
- Occupations: Journalist, author
- Years active: 1968–present
- Website: peterlance.com

Peter Lance (born February 18, 1948) is an American journalist and author. He is a five-time winner of the News & Documentary Emmy Award, the recipient of a Robert F. Kennedy Journalism Award, and other accolades detailed below. In April 2010, Lance was appointed as a one-year visiting scholar at the Orfalea Center for Global & International Studies at the University of California, Santa Barbara.

== Early life and education ==
Peter Anthony Lance was born in Newport, Rhode Island, the son of Joseph James Lance, a Navy Chief who had served on the USS Arkansas (BB-33) in World War II. His mother was Albina Marie Lance, the former deputy clerk for the Superior Court in Newport. Lance attended public grammar schools and was valedictorian of his class in 1966 at De La Salle Academy, a Catholic Christian Brothers boys high school. He majored in philosophy at Northeastern University in Boston where he was Managing Editor of the student newspaper, The Northeastern News. While a student, Lance worked weekends as a news producer for WEEI, the former CBS radio owned and operated station in Boston.

After getting a B.A. from Northeastern in 1971 he earned an M.S. at The Columbia Graduate School of Journalism in 1972 and later a J.D. from Fordham University School of Law in 1978.

== Early career ==
Lance began his journalism career as a cub reporter for The Newport Daily News while a student at Northeastern University. In his second summer with the paper he researched and reported a four-part investigative series on slum housing in Newport that won the 11th Annual Sevellon Brown Award given by the New England Associated Press Managing Editor's Association.

Working as a researcher for Ralph Nader's Center for The Study of Responsive Law, Lance spent one month each living with the families of a brick layer, a garbage collector and a policeman in Boston as part of a study that was published as The Workers: Portraits of Nine American Job Holders. Lance contributed research and writing to the book, authored by Kenneth Lasson. The Workers was one of dozens of books and reports produced during Nader's summer "task forces" during 1969–72, the interns of which came to be known as "Nader's Raiders".

In 1972, after graduating from the Columbia University Graduate School of Journalism, Lance worked as the assistant to the program director at WNET-TV, the PBS flagship station in New York. He soon began producing for The 51st State, a nightly news magazine where he won the first of his two New York Area Emmy awards for The Great American Land Hustle Part One.

In 1973 Lance moved to WABC-TV, where he won a second New York Area Emmy, the National Station Emmy, and the Robert F. Kennedy Journalism Award for The Willowbrook Case: The People vs. The State of New York.

In 1975, while working as a news producer at WABC-TV, Lance attended Fordham University School of Law as a night student. Studying at NYU Law School in the summer of 1977 he graduated from Fordham with a J.D. in 1978.

== ABC News ==
After graduating from Fordham University in 1978 Lance went to work as a producer for ABC News 20/20, where he won one National News & Documentary Emmy Awards in 1980 for Arson For Profit, and another in 1981 for Unnecessary Surgery, where he also served as a correspondent. In 1984 Lance began reporting as a correspondent for ABC News Nightline (1984–85). In 1985, he joined a new investigative unit on World News Tonight with Peter Jennings, where he worked until 1987. He reported dozens of stories, from Pentagon cost overruns to a scandal involving how the FAA had manipulated the number of near mid-air collisions. Between 1979 and 1982, Lance received three additional Emmy nominations for his investigative reporting.

In December, 1987, Lance left ABC News, and began working as a writer, and later story editor, producer and show runner in episodic television. He worked on several hit television shows, including Miami Vice and Wiseguy, but it was Lance's continuing work as an investigative journalist and nonfiction book author around 9/11 that attracted national attention.

== 9/11 investigation ==
Lance was the first mainstream journalist to argue that the two attacks on the World Trade Center—the 1993 bombing and the attacks of 9/11—were linked via Ramzi Yousef. A Kuwaiti national trained in Wales, Yousef was Qaeda's chief bomb maker. He is also the nephew of the terrorist the FBI calls "the 9/11 mastermind" Khalid Shaikh Mohammed (KSM). Lance's investigative work linking Yousef and al Qaeda master spy Ali Mohamed to the 9/11 attacks has been cited repeatedly in "The Complete 9/11 Timeline" compiled by the nonprofit History Commons, the respected compendium of open source 9/11 intelligence.

In August 2003, Lance's 1000 Years for Revenge, a broad survey of al Qaeda operations in the US prior to 9/11, was published by HarperCollins. The book presents evidence that the FBI missed dozens of opportunities to stop the attacks of September 11, dating back to 1989. Lance describes how an elusive al Qaeda mastermind defeated an entire American security system in "the greatest failure of intelligence since the Trojan Horse".

On September 2, 2003, CBS News Correspondent Dan Rather, broadcasting from Baghdad during the Iraq War, reviewed the evidence presented in 1000 Years for Revenge for two days in a row, devoting two 4-minute segments as the lead stories on The CBS Evening News With Dan Rather. On the first broadcast from Iraq, Rather said:

One thing seems clear, had there not been the murderous attacks of 9/11 there probably would have been no war. Now a new book to be released tomorrow, 1000 Years For Revenge: International Terrorism and the FBI, contends that the FBI could have and should have prevented the 9/11 attacks. (Lance) traces these lapses back to 1989 and an FBI surveillance of a group of Middle Eastern men at a Calverton, Long Island shooting range. Yet inexplicably they (the FBI) suddenly stopped watching after just one month.

Rather explains that the Calverton men became devoted followers of blind cleric Omar Abdel Rahman. Rahman brought in professional bomber Ramzi Yousef and the men began to plot the first World Trade Center bombing. The broadcast includes interviews with Lance, who states:

Of the men photographed by the FBI in 1989 three were later convicted in the original World Trade Center bombing, one was convicted in the murder of Rabbi Meir Kahane, and one was convicted in The Day of Terror plot to blow up the bridges and tunnels around Manhattan.... It was absolutely possible for the FBI to have identified and stopped Yousef in the fall of 1992 as he built the bomb. If they had stopped Ramzi Yousef in 1992, they would have stopped 9/11.

The FBI, Lance says in the report, could have stopped Yousef because they had an informant, Emad Salem, already in place. He was close enough to take a video, shown in the CBS Evening News broadcast, of a celebration that included several members of the original Calverton group and to hear whispers about bomb plot. But interoffice fighting at the FBI forced Salem to quit, leaving a chilling warning:

The last thing Emad Salem said to Nancy Floyd, his (FBI) control agent, before he left: 'Don't call me when the bombs go off.'

The next day, on September 3, 2003, Rather again led with coverage of 1000 Years for Revenge:

Ramzi Yousef, the bomber responsible for the 1993 World Trade Center bombing, had fled to the Philippines where police discovered his bomb factory. Yousef again escaped but his accomplice (Abdul Hakim Murad) was arrested and spilled the chilling plot to Philippines Police Colonel Rodolfo Mendoza.

Dan Rather then shows the Colonel, Mendoza, in a taped interview, talking to Lance:

Lance: "He (Abdul Hakim Murad) said that there was a plan at least to hijack planes and fly them into targets in the United States?"

Mendoza: "Yeah. Targets in the United States. CIA headquarters in Langley, Virginia."

Lance: "And did he mention any other targets to you?"

Medoza: "Later, later he told me about the possibility of hitting the Pentagon. He told me also that there is an unidentified nuclear facility."

Rather reported that Mendoza also provided "one more piece of information", quoting Lance as saying, "He said there were 10 Islamic pilots, at that moment in 1995 in America training in U.S. flight schools." Colonel Mendoza, says Lance, gave that information to the U.S. Embassy, including information that Osama bin Laden was funding Ramzi Yousef's plots.

In 2004, HarperCollins published a follow-up book to 1000 Years for Revenge.

Cover Up: What the Government Is Still Hiding About the War on Terror concludes that Al-Qaida showed signs of launching the impending 9/11 attacks in 1995, but were able to evade arrest by exploiting the poor relations between the FBI and CIA and problems within their respective infrastructures.

Another follow-on book, Triple Cross:How bin Laden's Master Spy Penetrated the CIA, the Green Berets, and the FBI—and Why Patrick Fitzgerald Failed to Stop Him, published in September 2006, covers the Al Qaeda operative Ali Mohamed. A review of the book by Rory O'Connor in The Guardian states: "In the annals of espionage, few men have moved in and out of the deep black world between the hunters and the hunted with as much audacity as Ali Mohamed.... The FBI allowed the chief spy for al-Qaida to operate right under their noses...They let him plan the bombings of the embassies in Africa right under their noses. Two hundred twenty-four people were killed and more than 4,000 wounded because of their negligence."

The publisher's summary for Triple Cross states:

This is the story of the most dangerous triple-agent in US history. Peter Lance, author of the highly acclaimed 1000 Years for Revenge and Cover Up, returns to uncover the story of Ali Mohamed, a trusted security advisor of Osama bin Laden who hoodwinked the United States for more than a decade. As Lance reveals for this first time, this one man served in a series of high-security position within the United States security establishment, as a Special Forces advisor, FBI informant, and CIA operative, while simultaneously helping orchestrate the al Qaeda campaign of terror that led to 9/11. In October 2000, after tricking three U.S. intelligence agencies for almost two decades, Ali Mohamed appeared in handcuffs and a blue prison jumpsuit in a Federal District courtroom on Manhattan's Lower East Side, where he pleaded guilty five times. His crimes included brokering terror summits, financing an attack on two Black Hawk helicopters, training jihadis in improvised bomb building and the creation of secret cells. And yet, for decades Mohamed had lived the life of a Silicon Valley computer executive. How did this evildoer move in and out of and around the U.S. is just one of the questions answered. From the Able Danger scandal of the Clinton Administration to today's CIA Leakgate, Mohamed appears at nearly every crucial turn of America's terror probes. An important final piece to the 9/11 investigation, Triple Cross penetrates Mohamed's secret past and the dark reaches of Al Qaeda to reveal the danger that still threatens America and its internal security.

The conclusion of the 9/11 Commission in Staff Statement No. 15 was that it was "a matter of debate" whether Yousef was a member of al Qaeda. Instead, the Commission called Yousef "part of a loose network of extremist Sunni Islamists who, like Bin Ladin, began to focus their rage on the United States". But on April 10, 2011, The New York Times ran a story confirming Lance's theory: In the piece titled "In Federal Court, a Docket Number for Global Terror", reporter Benjamin Weiser detailed how the Justice Department had amended the original 1993 World Trade Center bombing indictment to include KSM. The story was linked to a superseding indictment which now named KSM along Yousef and Abdul Hakim Murad, the pilot trained in four U.S. flights schools whom Lance first reported, based on intelligence from The Philippines National Police, was to be the original pilot in the "planes as missiles plot".

=== Attempt by Federal Prosecutor Patrick Fitzgerald to prevent publication of Triple Cross ===
In the fall of 2007, Federal prosecutor Patrick Fitzgerald, who was an assistant U.S. attorney in New York in the 1990s, threatened to sue publisher HarperCollins over the new edition of Triple Cross they published in June 2009 if it defamed him or cast him in a false light, calling the book "a deliberate lie masquerading as the truth". California is a false light defamation state which means that it is possible to sue for libel under certain circumstances not permitted in other states. However the publisher is located in New York.

Fitzgerald pressed his claim in 32 pages of threat letters sent to HarperCollins over 20 months. The U.S. attorney's threats resulted in a firestorm of coverage in the media, while Lance's research in Triple Cross was called "meticulous" by a writer for Forbes.com. In June 2009 HarperCollins defied Fitzgerald threats, publishing a new updated edition in trade paperback form.

Fitzgerald never made good on his threat to sue, despite a "dare" from Lance published in The Huffington Post a month after the publication of Triple Cross. Published under the headline, "Mr. Fitzgerald, In Your Threat to Sue for Libel, Please, Either Put Up or Shut Up" Lance wrote:

Seven weeks ago Patrick Fitzgerald, the most intimidating Federal prosecutor in America, sent my publisher (HarperCollins) and me a letter threatening to sue us for libel if Triple Cross, a book I wrote, critical of his anti-terrorism track record, was published.

Yesterday marked the four-week anniversary of the book's pub date and although it's been out for a month, we're still waiting for his summons and complaint.

It was the fourth threat letter that Fitzgerald had sent since October 2007 and the man who'd succeeded in getting New York Times reporter Judith Miller jailed for 85 days in the CIA leak probe was growing impatient....

The new (2009) edition of Triple Cross added material, including 26 pages detailing Fitzgerald's attempts to suppress the book. At a press conference for the new edition at the National Press Club in Washington, covered by the Reporters Committee for Freedom of the Press, Lance is quoted as saying "Fitzgerald is particularly sensitive to the issues discussed in the book because if they prove true, the prosecutor could face legal fallout of his own." Lance further chronicled the Fitzgerald censorship controversy and tied it into his investigation of the FBI's counterterrorism failures in "The Chilling Effect", a June 2009 article published in Playboy.

== Solving a 19-year-old al-Qaeda-related cold case ==
In 2010, Lance was contacted by Emad Salem, the ex-Egyptian army officer who had infiltrated the cell around blind Sheikh Omar Abdel-Rahman and the 1993 World Trade Center bombing conspiracy. Lance worked with Salem and ex-NYPD homicide detective James Moss to solve the homicide case of Mustafa Shalabi, who was killed by al-Qaeda operatives in 1992.

Lance's investigative reporting into the WTC bombing and Shalabi was published in "The Spy Who Came In for the Heat", an article for the August 2010 issue of Playboy, recapping his findings on the television show Morning Joe. Lance expanded his reporting in First Blood, another investigative piece published in Tablet Magazine. In that story Lance revealed new evidence of a second gunman in the 1991 assassination of Rabbi Meir Kahane. Lance offered proof that El Sayyid Nosair, the convicted killer of Kahane, also intended to murder former Israeli Prime Minister Ariel Sharon, a revelation that made page-one news in The Jerusalem Post.

== Censorship of "Operation Dark Heart" and Lt. Col Anthony Shaffer ==
In "The Private War of Anthony Shaffer", published in Playboy, January 2011, Lance detailed how The Pentagon censored Operation Dark Heart, the Afghan war memoir by Bronze Star recipient Lt. Col. Anthony Shaffer (intelligence officer). In Lance's book Triple Cross, Lance writes of Lt. Col. Shaffer's involvement in Operation Able Danger, a secret data-mining operation run from 1998 to 1999 that uncovered evidence that Mohammed Atta, the lead hijacker in the 9/11 plot, had been on the DOD's radar months prior to when the 9/11 Commission claimed he'd entered the U.S.

== 9/11, Murder Inc. and Deal with the Devil ==
Lance's research into the FBI and its close relations with Mafia informants began at ABC News Nightline, and was further informed by the nonfiction bestseller, Murder, Inc. The Story of the Syndicate by Brooklyn Assistant D.A. Burton Turkus and Sid Feder, first published in 1951. Murder, Inc. is a true account of the prosecution by Turkus of the organized crime syndicate "killing machine" known as "Murder, Inc.".

In 2012, Lance's imprint, Tenacity Media Books republished Murder, Inc. In the forward to that book Lance discusses how his examination of the FBI's counter-terrorism investigations led him to discover an extraordinary link between the FBI and a 1996 Bureau sting of an al Qaeda terrorist, in Federal jail in Lower Manhattan, conducted with the help of a captain in the Colombo crime family:

In the course of my research I uncovered dozens of FBI 302 memos documenting a sting by Greg Scarpa Jr. that was authorized by the FBI in which the mobster intercepted a series of notes from Yousef (al Qaeda terrorist and World Trade Center bomber Ramzi Yousef) including threats to hijack planes and plant bombs on US airliners so that he could achieve a mistrial in the prosecution of the "Bojinka" plot which the feds decided to try first in the summer of 1996. One piece of intelligence from Scarpa Jr. was worth its weight in platinum – the location of KSM who is hiding out in Doha Qatar. But by the time the FBI sent it to elite Hostage Rescue Team (HRT) to nab him, KSM had escaped only to succeed on 9/11 in doing what his nephew had failed to do in 1993 – take down the Twin Towers.

=== Deal with the Devil ===
In July 2013 HarperCollins published Deal With The Devil, the fourth investigative book in the series authored by Lance critical of the FBI in its organized crime and terrorism performance in the years leading up to the 9/11 attacks. Devil is a follow-on to Lance's preceding three books, 1000 Years for Revenge (2003), Cover-Up (2004), and Triple Cross (2006).

According to the publisher's book description on Amazon.com:

In his more than three decades in law enforcement, FBI Special Agent R. Lindley DeVecchio was considered one of the Bureau's top agents on organized crime. With contacts at the highest levels of the mob, he offered the Feds an unprecedented window into the workings of the Brooklyn families—and tips he supplied led to more than 70 successful prosecutions that helped propel a young district attorney named Rudolph Giuliani to national prominence. Yet, by the 1990s it was charged that "Mr. Organized Crime", as DeVecchio was known, had taken his infiltration too far. As Emmy-winning reporter Peter Lance discovered while researching his 2004 book Cover Up, DeVecchio had developed a very close relationship with Colombo crime family killer Greg Scarpa Sr., known as "The Grim Reaper". For years Scarpa was DeVecchio's informant—but some evidence allegedly suggested that Scarpa had provided him information that the mobster used in three murders during the Colombo mob wars of the 1980s. Though the DeVecchio story was only a subplot in a cover up, after its publication Hynes' office filed charges against DeVecchio—and cited Lance's investigation as a wonderful springboard to understand the story. Lance was subpoenaed by defense attorneys in connection with the 2007 trial. And yet in late 2007, the case against DeVecchio was dramatically dropped when the credibility of a key witness (unrelated to Lance's reporting) was impugned.

During a two-hour presentation on the book at The Mob Museum in Las Vegas televised by C-Span2's Book TV Lance announced he was developing Deal With The Devil as a multi-year dramatic cable TV series.

'Deal With the Devil', a phrase used in a decision by the late Judge Gustin Reichbach in his dismissal of the Lin DeVecchio murder case, is based on a case Brooklyn DA Charles Hynes called "the most stunning example of official corruption that I have ever seen".

== Investigation into police corruption in Santa Barbara ==
On January 1, 2011, Lance was driving home from a New Year's Eve party. Shortly after 1:00 am he was pulled over by Santa Barbara Police Officer Kasi Beutel who breath-tested Lance and then arrested him for driving under the influence. Lance pleaded innocent, and was exonerated after his criminal case was dismissed on November 15, 2011.

While contesting the charges against him Lance proceeded with his own investigation of the practices of the Santa Barbara police department, the results published in a 13-part series for the Santa Barbara News-Press. In the series, Lance alleges that the police systematically falsified evidence to obtain DUI convictions. His reportage was controversial because, among other things, Lance was being charged with DUI during the same period of time that he was investigating the police department and reporting his findings.

On August 2, 2011, the mayor and city administrator of Santa Barbara City pledged to investigate Lance's findings.

The Santa Barbara News-Press series charged that officer Beutel used pre-filled forms that would meet certain criteria "to guarantee a successful DUI arrest". Lance told the Santa Barbara Independent: "This is the essence of a dirty DUI cop framing innocent people." He compared the use of pre-filled forms to "something that would happen in the old Soviet Union".

In the 2011 News-Press series Lance also wrote that officer Beutel "may have committed bankruptcy fraud in 2000"; that she "perjured herself during divorce proceedings in 2005"; and that "she'd suborned the perjury of the minister who married her in 1999 by asking him to back-date her marriage license so that she might receive more post-divorce support".

On December 6, 2011, Lance filed a 21-page formal complaint against Police Chief Cam Sanchez of the Santa Barbara Police Department, asking for a full investigation of his allegations. The Department of Motor Vehicles (DMV) dropped all charges against Lance on March 6, 2012. On March 8, 2012, the Santa Barbara News-Press revealed that an outside consulting firm had been paid $12,000 for a report on the matter that they then kept secret.

In October 2012 the News-Press published a new five-part series by Lance that reported on "a local defense lawyer (who) suspected that someone in law enforcement had planted heroin on one of his clients — a woman arrested on suspicion of DUI by Officer Beutel" On October 7, 2012, Lance wrote:

At first I didn't believe it, despite the evidence I'd assembled by then, proving that Officer Beutel, the former head of the Santa Barbara Police Department's Drinking Driver Team and two-time Top DUI officer in the county had falsified police reports, committed perjury on a DMV form, witnessed at least five forged blood test waivers, withheld evidence from two suspects in violation of Brady rules, and pre-checked DUI forms before going into the field, suggesting a pre-determined mindset to frame innocent drivers.

I'd uncovered additional evidence regarding the accountant-turned-cop possibly committing bankruptcy fraud in 2000 and perjury in the course of divorce proceedings just months before she donned the uniform of the Santa Barbara Police Department in 2005.

Knowing all of that, I refused to accept that a sworn officer of the law could do something as repugnant as planting drugs on a suspect, much less heroin. Still, as with all the evidence in this investigation, I vetted the allegation with an open mind.

Over the months since then, as more and more information surfaced, including a videotape from County Jail where the discovery of the drug took place, I came to believe that it wasn't just possible, but probable that someone in law enforcement – perhaps Officer Beutel – had intentionally planted that bindle of black tar heroin at the feet of the DUI suspect, causing the District Attorney's Office to charge her on additional charges beyond driving under the influence.

On December 5, 2012, the Santa Barbara City Council voted to spend $208,000 to install video cameras in 27 Santa Barbara Police Department patrol cars. The move came after the recommendation of the Santa Barbara County Grand Jury in October 2011 following Lance's first series in which he reported for the first time that the SBPD was the largest police agency in the county without onboard video in patrol units; a factor that can lead to misconduct in DUI arrests.

== Books ==
- Deal with the Devil: The FBI's Secret Thirty-Year Relationship with a Mafia Killer ISBN 0061455342; ISBN 978-0061455346
- Cover Up: What the Government Is Still Hiding About the War on Terror ISBN 0-06-054355-8
- 1000 Years for Revenge: International Terrorism and the FBI—The Untold Story ISBN 0-06-059725-9
- Triple Cross: How Bin Laden's Chief Security Adviser Penetrated the CIA, the FBI, and the Green Berets ISBN 0-06-088688-9
- Stingray : The Lethal Tactics of the Sole Survivor ISBN 1-885840-03-9
- First Degree Burn ISBN 0-425-15698-2

== Awards ==
- Emmy (five times)
- List of Awards on Peter Lance website Retrieved September 6, 2012
