= Criticism of the 9/11 Commission =

Criticism levied at the 9/11 Commission's findings

The 9/11 Commission, which investigated the terrorist September 11 attacks on the United States, was subject to a variety of criticisms by politicians, government officers, and private groups and citizens. The commission was created on November 27, 2002 by a bill passed by the U.S. Congress and signed into law by President George W. Bush.

The 9/11 Commission was chaired by former New Jersey Governor Thomas Kean. Because the investigation was politically sensitive, many participants have been criticized during the process. Leading critics include members of the 9/11 Family Steering Committee and the Jersey Girls, who according to the documentary 9/11: Press for Truth, were instrumental in overcoming government resistance to establishing the 9/11 Commission.

The 9/11 Commission members were appointed by President George W. Bush and the United States Congress, which led to the criticism that the Commission was not independent. The Commission stated in 9/11 Commission Report that their "aim has not been to assign individual blame", a judgment which some critics believed would obscure the facts of the matter in a nod to consensus politics. In addition, some members of victims' families have claimed that the Commission had a conflict of interest.

== Conflicts of interest ==
Members of the 9/11 Commission, including its executive director Philip Zelikow, had conflicts of interest, critics allege. Philip Shenon, a reporter for The New York Times, in a book released in February 2008, entitled The Commission: The Uncensored History of the 9/11 Investigation claims that Zelikow had closer ties with the White House than he publicly disclosed and that he tried to influence the final report in ways that the staff often perceived as limiting the Bush administration’s responsibility and furthering its anti-Iraq agenda.

According to the book, Zelikow had at least four private conversations with former White House political director Karl Rove, and appears to have had many frequent telephone conversations with people in the White House. The Commission staff kept a record only of calls Zelikow received, but Government Accountability Office records show his frequent calls to the 456 telephone exchange in the 202 area code used exclusively by the White House. Also, the book states that Zelikow ordered his assistant to stop keeping a log of his calls, although the Commission's general counsel overruled him. Zelikow had pledged to have no contact with Rove and Condoleezza Rice during his work for the 9/11 Commission.

The book also reports that some panel staffers believed Zelikow stopped them from submitting a report depicting Condoleezza Rice's and Bush's performance as "amounting to incompetence or something not far from it". Zelikow has denied discussing the commission's work with Rove and further added "I was not a very popular person in the Bush White House when this was going on" and remarked the staffers were disgruntled.

According to Shenon, Rove always feared that a commission report that laid the blame for the September 11 attacks at the president's doorstep was the one development that could most jeopardize Bush's 2004 re-election. As a result, White House lawyers attempted to stonewall the creation of the commission and to hamstring its work from the outset. As Shenon reports, when Bush terrorism "czar" Richard Clarke could no longer be prevented from testifying about his urgent warnings over the summer of 2001 to Rice about the imminent threat of terrorist attack on US soil, White House counsel Alberto Gonzales and his aides feverishly drafted tough questions and phoned them in to Republican commissioners to undermine Clarke's credibility." According to Shenon, it was this defensive strategy that Zelikow may have been coordinating with the White House.

According to Shenon's book, Zelikow attempted to bolster the Bush administration's false claim of a link between al-Qaeda and Iraq by trying to change a 9/11 Commission staff report to state that the terrorist network repeatedly tried to communicate with the government of Saddam Hussein, a claim of cooperation the administration had cited to justify the war in Iraq. Zelikow backed down when the 9/11 Commission staff refused to go along with his attempted change.

In addition, other members had ties which could be viewed as conflicts of interest. Jamie Gorelick, while serving in the Department of Justice in the Clinton administration, developed the policy, known as the "wall memo", that prevented communication between various government law enforcement and intelligence agencies, including between the FBI and CIA. She also is on the board of United Technologies. Gorelick's firm has agreed to represent Prince Mohammed al Faisal in the suit by the 9/11 families. The families contend that al Faisal has legal responsibility for the September 11 attacks.

=== Henry Kissinger ===
The White House insisted that it was to appoint the commission's chair, leading some to question the commission's "independence". The initial person appointed to head the commission, Henry Kissinger, has been accused by many of having been involved in past government cover ups in South America, including the overthrow of the Salvador Allende government in Chile on September 11, 1973, and of having ongoing business relationships with members of the Bin Laden family in Saudi Arabia.

Even after Kissinger resigned, the White House was often cited as having attempted to block the release of information to the 9/11 Commission and for refusing to give interviews without tight conditions attached leading to threats to subpoena. The Bush Administration has further been accused of attempting to derail the commission by giving it one of the smallest independent commission funding levels in recent history ($3 million), and by giving the commission a very short deadline. The White House insists that they have given the commission "unprecedented cooperation".

While President Bush and Vice President Dick Cheney ultimately agreed to testify, they did so only under several conditions:

- They would be allowed to testify jointly;
- They would not be required to take an oath before testifying;
- The testimony would not be recorded electronically or transcribed, and that the only record would be notes taken by one of the commission staffers;
- These notes would not be made public.

The commission agreed to these conditions, and the president and vice president gave their testimony on April 29.

== Resistance to investigation ==
Commission chairman Thomas Kean and co-chairman Lee H. Hamilton accused the Central Intelligence Agency (CIA) of making a conscious decision to impede the commission’s inquiry after the agency received a memorandum prepared by Philip D. Zelikow, the panel's former executive director. Zelikow prepared this memorandum after former commission members reviewed thousands of classified documents following the disclosure that the CIA in November 2005 destroyed videotapes documenting the interrogations of two al-Qaeda operatives. The review concluded that the commission made repeated and detailed requests to the agency in 2003 and 2004 for documents and other information about the interrogation of operatives of al-Qaeda and that the commission was told by a top CIA official that the agency had "produced or made available for review" everything that had been requested. The memorandum concluded that "further investigation is needed" to determine whether the CIA's withholding of the tapes from the commission violated federal law.

John E. McLaughlin, the former Deputy Director of Central Intelligence, said that the CIA insisted that agency officials had always been candid with the commission and that information from the CIA proved central to their work. "We weren't playing games with them, and we weren't holding anything back" he added. A CIA spokesman also said that the agency had been prepared to give the commission the interrogation videotapes but that commission staff members never specifically asked for interrogation videos.

== Unreliable evidence ==
=== Interrogation under torture ===
In January 2008, NBC News released an investigative report on the 9/11 Commission's use of information acquired by torture of detainees. Current and former senior U.S. intelligence officials said that the operatives cited by the Commission were subjected to the harshest of the CIA’s methods, the "enhanced interrogation techniques", subsequently determined to be torture by U.S., United Nations, and European Union authorities. According to the NBC analysis, more than one quarter of all footnotes in the 9/11 Commission Report refer to CIA interrogations of al-Qaeda operatives who were subjected to the harsh interrogation techniques.

9/11 Commission staffers say they "guessed" but did not know for certain that harsh techniques had been used, and they were concerned that the techniques had affected the operatives’ credibility. At least four of the operatives whose interrogation was included in the 9/11 Commission Report claimed that they told interrogators critical information as a way to stop being "tortured."

Michael Ratner, president of the Center for Constitutional Rights, says he was "shocked" that the Commission never asked about extreme interrogation measures. "Most people look at the 9/11 Commission Report as a trusted historical document. If their conclusions were supported by information gained from torture, therefore their conclusions are suspect."

NBC News quoted Philip Zelikow, the 9/11 Commission's executive director, as saying that the Commission relied heavily on the information derived from the interrogations, but remained skeptical of it. Zelikow admits that "quite a bit, if not most" of its information on the official 9/11 story "did come from the interrogations."

=== FAA and NORAD ===
For more than two years after the attacks, officials with North American Aerospace Defense Command (NORAD) and the Federal Aviation Administration (FAA) provided inaccurate information about the response to the hijackings in testimony and media appearances. Authorities suggested that US air defenses had reacted quickly, that jets had been scrambled in response to the last two hijackings and that fighters were prepared to shoot down United Airlines Flight 93 if it threatened Washington, D.C.

The 9/11 Commission reported a year later that audiotapes from NORAD's Northeast headquarters and other evidence showed clearly that the military never had any of the hijacked airliners in its sights and at one point chased a phantom aircraft, American Airlines Flight 11, long after it had crashed into the World Trade Center. Maj. Gen. Larry Arnold and Col. Alan Scott, for instance, told the commission that NORAD had begun tracking United Flight 93 at 9:16 a.m., but the Commission determined that the airliner was not even hijacked until 12 minutes later. According to later testimony, the military was not aware of the flight until after it had crashed in Stonycreek Township, Pennsylvania.

The Commission was forced to use subpoenas to obtain the cooperation of the FAA and NORAD to release evidence such as audiotapes. The agencies' reluctance to release the tapes, along with emails, erroneous public statements, and other evidence, led some of the panel's staff members and commissioners to believe that authorities sought to mislead the Commission and the public about the September 11 attacks. "I was shocked at how different the truth was from the way it was described," said John Farmer, a former New Jersey attorney general who led the staff inquiry into events on September 11, in an August 2006 interview.

== Limited scope ==
In April 2002, Bush said that the investigation into the September 11 attacks should be confined to Congress because it deals with sensitive information that could reveal sources and methods of intelligence. But by September, the White House came under intense fire concerning the 9/11 Commission from many victims' families, and thus President Bush finally agreed to the creation of an "independent" 9/11 Commission. But many September 11 victims' families believed that the scope of the investigation by the Commission did not go far enough in investigating the US government's failures because the Commission was not to investigate intelligence failures.

The National Security Whistleblowers Coalition, consisting of former FBI, NSA, and other federal intelligence experts, claim the 9/11 Commission Report was fundamentally flawed because the Commission refused to hear, ignored, or censored testimony about the many pre–September 11 warnings given to the FBI and US intelligence agencies. These federal whistleblowers claim that in an effort to avoid having to hold any individual accountable, the 9/11 Commission turned a blind eye on FBI agent-provided evidence before September 11 regarding the 9/11 plot.

=== Able Danger ===
In August 2005, Lt. Col. Anthony Shaffer claimed he had informed 9/11 Commission executive director Philip D. Zelikow about a highly classified data-mining project called Able Danger that had identified two of the three terrorist cells responsible for the September 11 attacks. Shaffer said Zelikow was initially very interested and gave Shaffer his card to contact him again. However, Shaffer claims when he contacted Zelikow, he was no longer interested in information about Able Danger. The Commission later issued a response saying they found Shaffer "not sufficiently reliable" and the information was "lacking historical significance" and did not warrant further investigation. Subsequently, four additional "credible witnesses" have come forward to support Shaffer's account of Able Danger.

U.S. Representative Curt Weldon (R-PA) claimed Commission staff had received two briefings on Able Danger, one in October 2003 and another in July 2004. Former Senator Slade Gorton (R-WA), a member of the Commission, said: "Bluntly, it just didn't happen and that's the conclusion of all 10 of us." A search for documents on Able Danger has not been very productive, leading Curt Weldon to express extreme disappointment and to speculate that a coverup may have occurred.

The Pentagon investigated the matter and has not been able to find any documentary evidence confirming the allegations. Pentagon spokesman Army Maj. Paul Swiergosz said: "We've interviewed 80 people involved with Able Danger, combed through hundreds of thousands of documents and millions of e-mails and have still found no documentation of Mohamed Atta." Weldon claims that the Pentagon ordered the destruction of a large volume of documents related to Able Danger. The Pentagon stated that due to regulations regarding the collection of data on foreign visitors in the United States that the records had been destroyed.

=== FBI director's critique ===
Former FBI director Louis Freeh criticized the 9/11 Commission for ignoring key evidence from Able Danger, which he alleged resulted in false statements being made in the final 9/11 Commission Report. For example, the 9/11 Commission concluded that, "American intelligence agencies were unaware of Mr. Atta until the day of the attacks," which Mr. Freeh stated appears to be false. He stated that Able Danger had identified Mohamed Atta, the alleged ringleader of the 19 hijackers, as an al-Qaeda man active in the United States and was tracking him for many months.

Freeh criticized the Commission for allowing the Pentagon to withhold key evidence about the facts found by Able Danger and concluded that these inadequacies raised serious questions about the credibility of the 9/11 Commission.

== "Set up" to fail ==
The two co-chairs of the 9/11 Commission, Thomas Kean and Lee Hamilton, believe that the government established the 9/11 Commission in a way that ensured that it would fail. In their book, Without Precedent: The Inside Story of the 9/11 Commission, Kean and Hamilton describe their experience co-chairing the Commission. Hamilton listed a number of reasons for reaching this conclusion, including the late establishment of the Commission and the very short deadline imposed on its work; the insufficient funds ($3 million initially allocated for conducting an extensive investigation; though the Commission requested additional funds, it received only a fraction of the funds requested and the chairs still felt hamstrung); the many politicians who opposed the establishment of the Commission; the continuing resistance and opposition to the work of the Commission by many politicians, particularly those who did not wish to accept blame for any of what happened; the deception of the Commission by various key government agencies, including the U.S. Department of Defense, NORAD, and the Federal Aviation Administration; and the denial of access by various agencies to documents and witnesses that the Commission sought. "So there were all kinds of reasons we thought we were set up to fail", Hamilton argues.

== Denying support from Saudi Arabia ==
The 9/11 Commission Report concluded that while 15 of the 19 hijackers who carried out the September 11 attacks were from Saudi Arabia, there was no evidence the government of Saudi Arabia funded the attacks. However, it does identify private individuals and organizations in Saudi Arabia as the primary funding source for al-Qaeda overall.

Former Senator Bob Graham, the co-chair of an earlier congressional report into the 9/11 attacks, has called for re-opening an investigation into Saudi funding of the attack and the declassification of documents discussing the subject, including 28 pages from that report. Those 28 pages were subsequently declassified July 15, 2016.
