= Dark Heart =

Dark Heart may refer to:

- Dark Heart (TV series), a British television crime drama series
- The name of a villain in Care Bears
- Dark Heart, a novel in the Dragonlance fictional campaign setting; see List of Dragonlance novels
- "Dark Heart", an episode of Justice League Unlimited showcasing The Atom
- Operation Dark Heart, a 2010 memoir by U.S. Army intelligence officer Lt. Col Anthony Shaffer
- "Dark Heart", a 1994 single by Bomb the Bass featuring Spikey T also featured on their 1995 album Clear
- Dark Hearts, an independent film starring Kyle Schmid and Sonja Kinski
