= Scott Phillpott =

Scott Phillpott, a US Naval captain, came to prominence after informing the 2004 9/11 Commission that a data-mining project named Able Danger had identified hijack leader Mohamed Atta as a threat tied to al-Qaeda. Atta was living in Brooklyn as early as January 2000, many months before his attack in September 2001.

He was quoted by Fox News in August 2005 as stating I have briefed the Department of the Army, the Special Operations Command and the office of (Undersecretary of Defense for Intelligence) Dr. Cambone as well as the 9/11 Commission. My story has remained consistent. Atta was identified by Able Danger in January/February 2000.

Phillpott and a civilian technician identified as "JD Smith" were the two sources for Army Lt. Col. Anthony Shaffer's claims of an intelligence failure.

Phillpott has commanded the USS Typhoon (PC 5), USS Samuel Eliot Morison (FFG 13), USS ESTOCIN (FFG-15), and USS Leyte Gulf (CG 55).
