= Task Force Stratus Ivy =

United States Counterterrorism Task Force

Task Force Stratus Ivy was an American Department of Defense (DoD) counterintelligence unit that operated against Al-Qaeda cells in Afghanistan as a part of the Able Danger counterterrorism program. The primary tools of Stratus Ivy were the use of data mining and other means of cyberwarfare. The aim of the unit was to uncover terrorist cells and reveal terror operations before they occurred, and they even claimed to have discovered multiple perpetrators of the September 11 attacks almost a year before the attacks. The task force was the first covert offensive cyber unit at the DoD, and it was created and initially led by Lt. Colonel Anthony Shaffer.

In addition to its operations in Afghanistan, Stratus Ivy also had smaller penetration efforts in Iran and North Korea.
