= Gulf War Air Power Survey =

1993 US Air Force report

The Gulf War Air Power Survey is a report commissioned by the United States Air Force in 1993 to document and analyze its performance during the 1991 Gulf War. It consists of five sections each averaging over 700 pages, and a 276-page summary report. It was one of the most popular reports issued by the U.S. military at the time.

On 22 August 1991, then Secretary of the Air Force Donald B. Rice commissioned an independent study "to review all aspects of air warfare in the Persian Gulf". Rather than a historical account, it analyses the operational level of the air war, in which 52,788 sorties were carried out, resulting in 41,309 strikes. The study was directed by Eliot A. Cohen, a professor at Johns Hopkins University's School of Advanced International Studies, and the research and writing was carried out by teams consisting of civilians, and retired and active military officers.

In 2002, the Air Force removed links to the study from its websites in what the Federation of American Scientists (FAS) called "merely one instance of a continuing government-wide trend of removing unclassified information from public access on the web." In response, FAS posted copies of the report to its own website. The study was subsequently put back on the military sites.

== Volumes ==
The following volumes that are currently available on the Defense Technical Information Center digital repository:

Volume	Title	Pages	Year
1	Planning and Command and Control	686	1993
2	Operations and Effects and Effectiveness	838	1993
3	Logistics and Support	779	1993
4	Weapons, Tactics, and Training and Space Operations	529	1993
5	A Statistical Compendium and Chronology	972	1993
