= Able Danger =

Classified military planning effort against transnational terrorism

Able Danger was a classified military planning effort led by the U.S. Special Operations Command (SOCOM) and the Defense Intelligence Agency (DIA). It was created as a result of a directive from the Joint Chiefs of Staff in early October 1999 by Chairman of the Joint Chiefs of Staff Hugh Shelton, to develop an information operations campaign plan against transnational terrorism.

According to statements by Lt. Col. Anthony Shaffer and those of four others, Able Danger had identified two of three al-Qaeda cells active in the September 11 attacks; the 'Brooklyn cell' linked to "Blind Sheik" Omar Abdel-Rahman, including 9/11 leader Mohamed Atta, and three of the plot's other 19 hijackers.

In December 2006, a sixteen-month investigation by the US Senate Intelligence Committee concluded "Able Danger did not identify Mohamed Atta or any other 9/11 hijacker at any time prior to September 11, 2001", and dismissed other assertions that have fueled 9/11 conspiracy theories. The Senate Judiciary Committee first attempted to investigate the matter for the Senate in September, 2005. The Pentagon "ordered five key witnesses not to testify", according to Senate Judiciary Committee Chairman Arlen Specter. "That looks to me as if it may be obstruction of the committee's activities", Specter, R-Pennsylvania, said at the start of his committee's hearing into the unit.

Attorney Mark Zaid, representing Lt. Colonel Anthony Shaffer and the other four Able Danger employees at the Senate Judiciary Committee hearing in September 2005, pointed out to the Committee that his clients had been forbidden by the Pentagon to testify to the committee. He also discussed the Defense Intelligence Agency's decision to suspend Lt. Colonel Shaffer's security clearance shortly after it became known that he had provided information to the 9/11 Commission on Able Danger. "Based on years of experience I can say categorically that the basis for the revocation was questionable at best."

An investigation by the Defense Department Inspector General's office (IG) in September 2006 concluded that "the evidence did not support assertions that Able Danger identified the September 11, 2001, terrorists nearly a year before the attack, that Able Danger team members were prohibited from sharing information with law enforcement authorities, or that DoD officials acted against LTC Shaffer for his disclosures regarding Able Danger." However, some of the people questioned by the IG claimed their statements to the IG were distorted by investigators in the final IG's report, and the report omitted essential information that they had provided. Lt. Col Tony Shaffer has claimed that the DoD retaliated against him for speaking out publicly about the IG report's distortions.

The Senate panel of investigators said there was no evidence DoD lawyers stopped analysts from sharing findings with the FBI before the attacks. Analysts had created charts that included pictures of then-known Al Qaeda operatives, but none including Atta. A follow-up chart made after the attacks did show Atta. The Senate Committee said its findings were consistent with those of the DoD inspector general, released in September 2006.

== Overview ==
The program used data mining techniques to associate open source information with classified information in an attempt to make connections among individual members of terrorist groups as part of its original "intelligence preparation of the battlespace". The objective of this particular project was to ascertain whether the data mining techniques and open source material were effective tools in determining terrorist activities, and if the resultant data could be used to create operational plans that could be executed in a timely fashion to interrupt, capture and/or destroy terrorists or their cells.

According to statements by Lt. Col. Anthony Shaffer and those of four others, Able Danger had identified 2 of 3 Al Qaeda cells active in the 9/11 attacks; the 'Brooklyn cell' linked to Blind Sheik Omar Abdel-Rahman, including September 11 attacks leader Mohamed Atta, and three of the 9/11 plot's other 19 hijackers, as possible members of an al Qaeda cell linked to the 1993 World Trade Center bombing.

This theory was heavily investigated and researched by Republican Representative Curt Weldon, vice chairman of the House Armed Services and House Homeland Security committees. However, Defense Intelligence Agency leadership had already ordered the hurried destruction of mined data, source databases, charts and resultant documents on entirely spurious legal grounds. DIA also prevented key personnel from testifying to both the Senate Judiciary and Senate Intelligence Committees, though after numerous denials did admit the program's existence.

In December 2006, an investigation by the US Senate Intelligence Committee concluded that assertions could not be confirmed. It stated that they were unable to find supporting evidence regarding "one of the most disturbing claims about the Sept. 11 terrorist strikes." This report released by the Senate Intelligence Committee copied, nearly verbatim, the United States Department of Defense Inspector General's September 2006 report on Able Danger.

== Assertion that Able Danger identified 9/11 hijackers ==
The existence of Able Danger, and its purported early identification of the 9/11 terrorists, was first disclosed publicly on June 19, 2005, in an article by Keith Phucas, a reporter for The Times Herald, a Norristown, Pennsylvania, daily newspaper. Eight days later, on June 27, 2005, Representative Curt Weldon, vice chairman of the House Armed Services and House Homeland Security committees and the principal source for the Phucas article, gave a special orders speech on the House floor detailing Able Danger:

Mr. Speaker, I rise because information has come to my attention over the past several months that is very disturbing. I have learned that, in fact, one of our Federal agencies had, in fact, identified the major New York cell of Mohamed Atta prior to 9/11; and I have learned, Mr. Speaker, that in September 2000, that Federal agency actually was prepared to bring the FBI in and prepared to work with the FBI to take down the cell that Mohamed Atta was involved in in New York City, along with two of the other terrorists. I have also learned, Mr. Speaker, that when that recommendation was discussed within that Federal agency, the lawyers in the administration at that time said, you cannot pursue contact with the FBI against that cell. Mohamed Atta is in the U.S. on a green card, and we are fearful of the fallout from the Waco incident. So we did not allow that Federal agency to proceed.

Rep. Weldon later reiterated these concerns during news conferences on February 14, 2006. He believed that Able Danger identified Mohamed Atta 13 separate times prior to 9/11 and that the unit also identified a potential situation in Yemen two weeks prior to the October 12, 2000 attack on the USS Cole. The Pentagon released a statement in response, stating that they wished to address these issues during a congressional hearing before a House Armed Services subcommittee scheduled for Wednesday, February 15, 2006.

=== Able Danger and the 9/11 Commission ===
Curt Weldon's assertion that Able Danger identified the 9/11 hijackers was picked up by the national media in August 2005, after it was reported in the bimonthly Government Security News. In addition to asserting that Able Danger identified the 9/11 hijackers and was prevented from passing that information onto the FBI, Weldon also alleged the intelligence concerning Able Danger was provided to the 9/11 Commission and ignored. Two 9/11 Commission members, Timothy J. Roemer and John F. Lehman, both claimed not to have received any information on Able Danger.

Following the GSN report, members of the 9/11 Commission began commenting on the information they had on Able Danger and Atta. Lee H. Hamilton, former vice chair of the 9/11 Commission, and Alvin S. Felzenberg, a former spokesman for the 9/11 Commission, both denied that the 9/11 Commission had any information on the identification of Mohamed Atta prior to the attacks. Hamilton told the media, "The Sept. 11 commission did not learn of any U.S. government knowledge prior to 9/11 of surveillance of Mohamed Atta or of his cell.... Had we learned of it obviously it would've been a major focus of our investigation."

On August 12, 2005, Hamilton and 9/11 Commission chairman Thomas Kean issued a statement in response to media inquiries about the commission's investigation of the Able Danger program. It stated the commission had been aware of the Able Danger program, and requested and obtained information about it from the Department of Defense, but none of the information provided had indicated the program had identified Atta or other 9/11 hijackers. They further stated that a claim about Atta having been identified prior to the attacks had been made to the 9/11 Commission on July 12, 2004, just days before the commission's report was released, by a United States Navy officer employed at DOD, but that

The interviewee had no documentary evidence and said he had only seen the document briefly some years earlier. He could not describe what information had led to this supposed Atta identification. Nor could the interviewee recall, when questioned, any details about how he thought a link to Atta could have been made by this DOD program in 2000 or any time before 9/11. The Department of Defense documents had mentioned nothing about Atta, nor had anyone come forward between September 2001 and July 2004 with any similar information. Weighing this with the information about Atta's actual activities, the negligible information available about Atta to other U.S. government agencies and the German government before 9/11, and the interviewer's assessment of the interviewee's knowledge and credibility, the Commission staff concluded that the officer's account was not sufficiently reliable to warrant revision of the report or further investigation.

Congressman Curt Weldon issued a response to the 9/11 Commission clarifying the mission of Able Danger, expressing concern over the statements made by various members of the 9/11 Commission, and promising to push forward until it is understood why the DoD was unable to pass the information uncovered by Able Danger to the FBI, and why the 9/11 Commission failed to follow up on the information they were given on Able Danger.

The 9/11 Commission has released multiple statements over the past week, each of which has significantly changed – from initially denying ever being briefed to acknowledging being briefed on both operation ABLE DANGER and Mohamed Atta. The information was omitted primarily because they found it to be suspect despite having been briefed on it two times by two different military officers on active duty. Additionally, the 9/11 Commission also received documents from the Department of Defense on ABLE DANGER.

Congressman Weldon reiterated these statements in testimony before the Senate Judiciary Committee on September 21, 2005.

=== Able Danger data destroyed ===
In his book Countdown to Terror, Weldon asserted that an Able Danger chart produced in 1999 identifying 9/11 hijackers Mohamed Atta, Marwan al-Shehhi, Khalid al-Mihdhar and Nawaf al-Hazmi had been presented to then-Deputy National Security Advisor Jim Steinberg. Weldon went on to claim that he had personally presented the chart to then-Deputy National Security Advisor Stephen Hadley in 2001, days after the 9/11 attacks.

He later stated that he was no longer sure that Atta's name appeared on that document.

Congressman Peter Hoekstra, who was then chairman of the House Intelligence Committee, investigated the matter at Weldon's request, was reported to have cautioned against "hyperventilating" before the completion of a "thorough" probe. Pentagon officials said they were unaware that any Able Danger material named Atta. They declined to comment on the reports as they worked to clarify the matter.

On August 14, 2005, Mike Kelly, a columnist for The (Bergen) Record (New Jersey), described a telephone interview, arranged by the staff of Rep. Curt Weldon, with a man who identified himself as a member of the Able Danger team, but asked that his name not be revealed. In the interview, the man claimed his team had identified Mohamed Atta and three other 9/11 hijackers as likely Al-Qaeda terrorists operating in the United States, but were prevented from passing this information on to the FBI by government lawyers. He also claimed he was ignored by the 9/11 Commission's staff when he approached them on two occasions to explain Able Danger's work.

On September 15, 2005, Weldon asserted that he had identified an employee who had been ordered to destroy the 2.5 terabytes (TB) of data collected by Able Danger two years before the 9/11 attack.

== Weldon changes his story ==
A Time magazine article dated August 14, 2005, reports that Weldon admitted he is no longer sure that Atta's name was on the chart he presented to Hadley and that he was unable to verify whether this was the case, having handed over his only copy, and that a reconstruction was used for post-9/11 presentations. Weldon gave a talk at The Heritage Foundation with a chart he described as the one handed over on May 23, 2002. However, a week later he referred reporters to a recently reconstructed version of the chart in his office where, among dozens of names and photos of terrorists from around the world, there was a color mug shot of Mohamed Atta, circled in black marker.

== Comments by members of the Able Danger team ==
=== Lt. Col. Anthony Shaffer ===
After Weldon's assertions were disputed, Lt. Col. Anthony Shaffer, a member of the Able Danger team, identified himself as Weldon's source. Shaffer claimed that he alerted the FBI in September 2000 about the information uncovered by the secret military unit "Able Danger", but he alleges three meetings he set up with bureau officials were blocked by military lawyers. Shaffer, who at the time worked for the Defense Intelligence Agency, claims he communicated to members of the 9/11 Commission that Able Danger had identified two of the three cells responsible for 9/11 prior to the attacks, but the Commission did not include this information in their final report.

Shaffer specifically states that in January 2000, Able Danger data-mining revealed the existence of a 'Brooklyn' Al-Qaeda cell connected to the "Blind Sheik" Omar Abdel-Rahman, as well as two other cells overseas. Shaffer & Philpott examined this chart of Al Qaeda suspected operatives, containing names & photos, and Philpott pointed out one particular sinister and "scary looking dude" -- Mohammed Atta. However, on December 22, 2006, a 16-month investigation by the Senate Intelligence Committee concluded that Able Danger, "did not identify Mohamed Atta or any other 9/11 hijacker at any time prior to September 11, 2001,". The Defense Department's inspector general (DoD OIG) made a similar conclusion.

Shaffer's lawyer, Mark Zaid, has revealed that Shaffer had been placed on paid administrative leave for what he called "petty and frivolous" reasons and had his security clearance suspended in March 2004, following a dispute over travel mileage expenses and personal use of a work cell phone. According to the DIA, Shaffer came under investigation while deployed as a staff officer in Afghanistan due to a pattern of misconduct including obtaining a service medal under false pretenses, improperly flashing military identification while drunk, theft, and falsely claiming reimbursement for mileage and personal mobile phone charges.

Congressman Weldon asked for a new probe into the activities undertaken to silence Lt. Col. Shaffer from publicly commenting on Able Danger and Able Danger's identification of the 9/11 hijackers. Weldon called the activities "a deliberate campaign of character assassination." An investigation the Defense Department's inspector general concluded that "DIA officials did not reprise against LTC Shaffer, in either his civilian or military capacity, for making disclosures regarding Able Danger".

Shaffer has also told the story of Central Intelligence Agency (CIA) opposition to Able Danger, prior to 9/11, based on the view that Able Danger was encroaching on CIA turf. According to Shaffer, the CIA representative said, "I clearly understand. We're going after the leadership. You guys are going after the body. But, it doesn't matter. The bottom line is, CIA will never give you the best information from "Alex Base" or anywhere else. CIA will never provide that to you because if you were successful in your effort to target Al Qaeda, you will steal our thunder. Therefore, we will not support this."

=== Navy Captain Scott Phillpott ===
Capt. Scott Phillpott confirmed Shaffer's claims. "I will not discuss this outside of my chain of command", Phillpott said in a statement to Fox News. "I have briefed the Department of the Army, the Special Operations Command and the office of (Undersecretary of Defense for Intelligence) Dr. Cambone as well as the 9/11 Commission. My story has remained consistent. Atta was identified by Able Danger in January/February 2000", he was quoted as saying.

=== James D. Smith ===
Shaffer's claims were also confirmed by James D. Smith, a civilian contractor who worked on Able Danger. In an interview with Fox News, Smith reported that the project had involved analysis of data from a large number of public sources and 20 to 30 individuals.

Smith stated that Atta's name had emerged during an examination of individuals known to have ties to Omar Abdel Rahman, a leading figure in the first World Trade Center bombing.

=== Major Erik Kleinsmith ===
Major Erik Kleinsmith, who was with the Army and chief of intelligence for LIWA until February 2001, testified that he was ordered to destroy Able Danger's information. "I deleted the data", he said. "There were two sets, classified and unclassified, and also an 'all sorts,'" which contained a blend of the two, "plus charts we'd produced." Kleinsmith deleted the 2.5 terabytes of data in May and June, 2000, on orders of Tony Gentry, general counsel of the Army Intelligence and Security Command.

=== Other witnesses ===
The Defense Department announced its findings on September 1, 2005, after a three-week investigation into Able Danger. The statement announced the discovery of three other witnesses in addition to Shaffer and Phillpott who confirm Able Danger had produced a chart that "either mentioned Atta by name as an al-Qaeda operative [and/or] showed his photograph." Four of the five witnesses remember the photo on the chart. The fifth remembers only Atta being cited by name. The Pentagon describes the witnesses as "credible" but stated that the document which allegedly mentioned Atta could not be found.

== The wall ==
Former chief assistant U.S. attorney Andrew McCarthy and others have asserted that the Able Danger intelligence was suppressed as a result of a policy of forbidding the CIA and FBI to share intelligence known as "the wall." During the 9/11 Commission hearings, then-Attorney General John Ashcroft testified the wall was strengthened under the Clinton administration by Jamie Gorelick to prohibit sharing of terrorist intelligence within the federal government.

This assertion was disputed by former senator Slade Gorton (R-WA), a member of the 9/11 Commission, who said, "nothing Jamie Gorelick wrote had the slightest impact on the Department of Defense or its willingness or ability to share intelligence information with other intelligence agencies." Gorton also asserted that "the wall" was a long-standing policy that had resulted from the Church Committee in the 1970s, and that the policy only prohibits transfer of certain information from prosecutors to the intelligence services and never prohibited information flowing in the opposite direction.

== Skepticism ==
=== Two Attas theory ===
Mickey Kaus of Slate, referring to Tom Maguire's "Two Attas" theory, speculates that "the 'Atta' fingered by Able Danger was really the first, 'Abu Nidal' Atta, and not the second, 9/11 'Al Qaeda' Atta", and that this may help explain this Able Danger issue. Snopes clarified a widely circulated email that claimed the two Attas were one and the same.

Another variation of the Two Attas theory reported by Kaus notes that Omar Abdel Rahman also had an associate with the name Mohamed El-Amir (a name sometimes used by Atta) who was not the Mohamed Atta involved in the 9/11 hijacking.

However, Shaffer clarified that. He told 9/11 Commission staffers Able Danger identified three of the individuals in the terrorist cells that conducted the 9/11 attacks, to include Atta - Shaffer did not mention the names of any other of the 9/11 hijackers in his disclosure to the 9/11 staff. A fourth 9/11 terrorist came from the second cell. Eric Umansky states the problem this way: "In fact, the two-Atta theory only leaves one major issue unexplained: What about the three other 9/11 hijackers that Able Danger purportedly fingered?

The Department of Defense released a report addressing the issue of two possible individuals with the last name of Atta and explaining that it was basically a clerical error.

When we reviewed INS records, they appeared to reflect two entries by Atta into the United States on January 10, 2001, which initially raised a question as to whether Atta had entered twice on the same day or whether a second person posing as Atta also entered on January 10, 2001. The NIIS printout for the first entry reflects that Atta entered with an admission period of January 10, 2001, to September 8, 2001 (admission number 68653985708). The second record reflects a second entry on January 10, 2001, with an admission period from January 10, 2001, to July 9, 2001 (admission number 10847166009). However, this occurred because the inspector at the Miami District Office who changed Atta's admission date failed to follow the proper procedure to ensure that the previous entry would be corrected, and a new entry was created in NIIS. The inspector sent the old I-94 and the corrected I-94 to the contractor which data enters I-94s for the INS. The May 2, 2001, transaction with Atta was data entered and then uploaded to NIIS as if it were a new entry by Atta. This happened because the inspector issued a new I-94 with a new admission number on it. To prevent two entries from occurring in NIIS, the inspector should have crossed out the admission number on the new I-94, made a reference to the previous admission number and noted that it was not a new entry.

IG report is disputed by Lt. Col. Shaffer and other Able Danger team members, some of whom were never interviewed by the IG's office nor the 9/11 commission. Congressman Weldon also claims the report was a hurried, botched up investigation that was intended to close the books on the subject rather than report on the facts.

For example this lead was never followed: "Normen Pentolino, operations manager at the Hollywood store, said two cashiers told FBI agents they might have recognized Atta, but weren't certain. Sources inside the store said Atta may have held a BJ's membership card for more than two years."

=== Timing ===
Kevin Drum, writing for The Washington Monthly notes that reports of the precise date at which the information was allegedly passed to the FBI vary considerably. It is most unlikely that Able Danger would have identified a terrorist called "Mohamed Atta" before May 2000.

Since 9/11, of course, we have retrieved every scrap of information ever known about Mohamed Atta, so we know what information would have been available to the Able Danger data mining operation. And what we know is that Mohamed Atta sent his first email to friends in the U.S. in March 2000 and received his first U.S. visa on May 18, 2000. Moreover, that was the first time he had ever gone by the name "Mohamed Atta." His full name is "Mohamed Mohamed el-Amir Awad el-Sayed Atta", and prior to 2000 he went by "Mohamed el-Amir".

== Congressional hearings ==
Senate Judiciary Committee Chairman Arlen Specter held a hearing on September 21, 2005, looking into the facts about Able Danger. However, Lt. Col. Shaffer and the other four members of Able Danger were ordered not to testify by the Department of Defense. Senator Specter decided to go forward with the hearings anyway.

Senator Specter wondered if the Posse Comitatus Act may have been the reason Defense Department attorneys would not allow Able Danger to turn over information to the FBI. The Posse Comitatus Act prevents the military from being engaged in law enforcement activities, including gathering information on U.S. persons, despite the aliens were not specifically United States citizens. Speaking on behalf of Lt. Col. Shaffer, attorney Mark Zaid testified "Those within Able Danger were confident they weren't compiling information on US persons. They were potentially people connected to US persons."

Zaid also strongly asserted on behalf of his clients,

"Let me emphasize two specific items for clarification purposes because they have been distorted and invited undue criticism from some.

At no time did Able Danger identify Mohamed Atta as being physically present in the United States.

No information obtained at the time would have led anyone to believe criminal activity had taken place or that any specific terrorist activities were being planned. Again, the identification of the four 9/11 hijackers was simply through associational activities. Those associations could have been completely innocuous or nefarious. It was impossible to tell which, and the unclassified work of Able Danger was not designed to address that question."

He further added that

"unfortunately we are not aware of the continuing existence of any chart containing Mohamed Atta's name or photograph. The copies that would have been in the possession of the U.S. Army were apparently destroyed by March 2001. The copies within Lt Col Shaffer's files were destroyed by the DIA in approximately Spring 2004. The destruction of these files is an important element to this story and I encourage the Committee to investigate it further. It would appear, particularly given the Defense Department's outright refusal to allow those involved with Able Danger to testify today, that an obstructionist attitude exists. The question for this Committee is to investigate how far that position extends and why."

Former Army Major Erik Kleinsmith, former head of the Pentagon's Land Warfare Analysis Department, testified at the hearing that he had been instructed to destroy data and documents related to Able Danger in May and June 2000. When asked whether the information could have prevented the attack on September 11 of 2001, he answered that he would not speculate to that, but that the information might have been useful.

== Subsequent investigations ==
On February 14, 2006, Congressmen Curt Weldon charged that contrary to testimony, not all the data on Able Danger had been destroyed. Weldon claimed to be in contact with people in the government still able to do data-mining who got 13 hits on Mohamed Atta. Weldon also claimed that Able Danger information was found in Pentagon files as recently as two weeks prior to his statement and that a general was present when the files were taken from the cabinet. The next day, there was a joint committee meeting with the Subcommittee on Terrorism, Unconventional Threats and Capabilities and the Subcommittee on Strategic Forces, to discuss the Able Danger program.

On September 21, 2006, The Washington Post reported that a Defense Department investigation into Able Danger found that Able Danger did not identify Mohamed Atta or any other hijacker before the September 11 attacks, and that a widely discussed chart was "a sample document passed to the military as an example of how to organize large amounts of data", and was created after 9/11.

=== Inspector General's report ===
On September 18, 2006, the Office of the Deputy Inspector General for Investigations released a report stating that Shaffer was put on leave, that the crew responsible for removing any classified documents from his office to prevent his taking them home with him found that he did not have any of the Able Danger-related documents trusted to him he claimed he had, and that despite the fact that the Army cleared him of any wrongdoing in the allegations "DIA officials would have taken action to revoke LTC Shaffer's access and clearance regardless of his disclosures to the DIA IG, the 9/11 Commission staff members, Members of Congress, or the media.

The Department of Defense investigation concluded:

- The anti-terrorist program, Able Danger, did not identify Mohamed Atta or any other 9/11 terrorists before the 9/11 attack.
- Able Danger members were not prohibited from sharing intelligence information with law enforcement authorities or other agencies that could have acted on that information. In fact, Able Danger produced no actionable intelligence information.
- The destruction of Able Danger documentation at LIWA and Garland was appropriate and complied with applicable DoD regulations.
- The Able Danger program was not terminated prematurely. It concluded after it had achieved its objective and its work products were used in follow-on intelligence gathering efforts at USSOCOM."

==== Alleged evidence of IG cover-up ====
Five witnesses who had worked on Able Danger and had been questioned by the Defense Department's Inspector General later told investigative journalists that their statements to the IG were distorted by investigators in the final IG's report, or the report omitted essential information that they had provided. The alleged distortions of the IG report centered around excluding any evidence that Able Danger had identified and tracked Atta years before 9/11. The witnesses reported to the journalists that the IG investigators got increasingly hostile in an effort to intimidate the witnesses into changing their testimony to drop any assertion that they had identified and tracked Atta, and this suggests a cover-up by the IG of Able Danger's findings. Witnesses reported telling Philip Zelikow, executive director of the 9/11 Commission, that Able Danger had identified Atta well before the 9/11 attacks, but Zelikow showed no interest in their testimony. Lt. Col Tony Shaffer also reported that the DOD has retaliated against him for speaking out publicly about the IG report's distortions.

== Movie ==
The independent film Able Danger was released in 2008. The screenplay written by Paul Krik centers around a Brooklyn, New York coffee shop owner who receives a disk proving a tie between the CIA and the 9/11 attacks.

== Book ==
Operation Dark Heart by Anthony A. Shaffer, released in September 2010, includes memories of his time reporting to the 9/11 Commission about Able Danger's findings. The 10,000 copies of the books have not been released yet. The DOD's Defense Intelligence Agency reviewers identified more than 200 passages suspected of containing classified information. "Specifically, the DIA wanted references to a meeting between Lt. Col. Tony Shaffer, the book's author, and the executive director of the 9/11 Commission, Philip Zelikow, removed". DOD took the highly unusual step of purchasing all available copies of Shaffer's book at a cost of $47,000 and destroying them to deny the public the ability to read the book.

== See also ==
- 9/11 Commission
- 9/11 Commission Report
- Criticisms of the 9/11 Commission Report
- September 11, 2001 attacks
- Bin Laden Issue Station, the CIA's bin Laden tracking unit, 1996–2005
- Task Force Stratus Ivy, a task force associated with Able Danger
- War games in progress on September 11, 2001
- Collapse of the World Trade Center
- 9/11 conspiracy theories
