= Bob Edgar =

American politician (1943–2013)

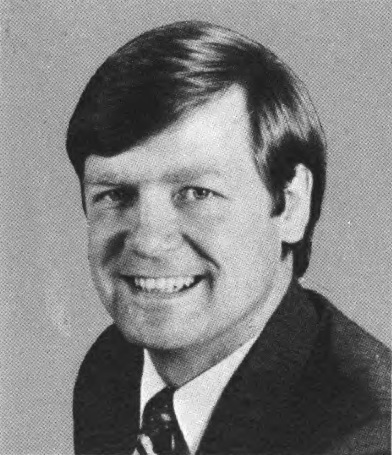

Member of the U.S. House of Representatives from Pennsylvania's 7th district
- In office January 3, 1975 – January 3, 1987
- Preceded by: Lawrence Williams
- Succeeded by: Curt Weldon

Personal details
- Born: Robert William Edgar; May 29, 1943 Philadelphia, Pennsylvania, U.S.
- Died: April 23, 2013 (aged 69) Burke, Virginia, U.S.
- Party: Democratic
- Spouse: Merle Louise Deaver
- Children: 3
- Education: Drew University
- Occupation: Politician, administrator, educator, chaplain

Robert William Edgar (May 29, 1943 – April 23, 2013) was an American politician, administrator, and religious leader. A native of the Philadelphia area, he began his career as a Methodist pastor and chaplain. He served as a Democratic member of the United States House of Representatives from 1975 to 1987, representing the 7th district of Pennsylvania. He was the unsuccessful Democratic candidate for United States Senate in Pennsylvania in 1986.

After leaving Congress, Edgar served in various religious and political organizations, including as president of the Claremont School of Theology from 1990 to 2000, and as president and CEO of Common Cause, a nonpartisan government watchdog organization, from 2007 until his death.

== Background ==
Edgar was born in Philadelphia, Pennsylvania, and grew up in Springfield, Pennsylvania.

He attended Lycoming College in Williamsport, Pennsylvania, where he received a Bachelor of Arts degree, and then was ordained a minister after graduating with a Master of Divinity degree from the Theological School of Drew University in Madison, New Jersey. He received a certificate in pastoral psychiatry from Hahnemann University Hospital in Philadelphia in 1969. He later served as United Protestant Chaplain of Drexel University, and as a special assistant to Congressman Bill Gray. He was also the pastor of a Methodist church in Lansdowne, Pennsylvania.

Edgar and his wife, the former Merle Louise Deaver, had three sons.

== Congressional career ==
With his 1974 election to the House of Representatives, Edgar became the first Democrat in 36 years to represent this Delaware County-based district.

Serving in the United States Congress from 1975 to 1987, Edgar sought to improve public transportation, authored the community Right to Know provisions of Super Fund legislation, and co-authored the new G.I. Bill for the all-volunteer service. Among other appointments, he served as chair of the Congressional Clearinghouse on the Future from 1982 through 1986, and as a member of the House Select Committee on Assassinations, from 1976 through 1978, that investigated the deaths of Dr. Martin Luther King Jr., and President John F. Kennedy.

Representing what was then a classic Rockefeller Republican district, Edgar was reelected five times against vigorous Republican opposition. His closest contests came in 1978, when he only survived by 1,300 votes, and in 1984, when he won by only 412 votes. The latter election came in the midst of Ronald Reagan's landslide reelection victory; Reagan won the district by over 20 points.

Edgar ran for the United States Senate in 1986, defeating Auditor General Don Bailey, a former congressman from western Pennsylvania, in the primary, but lost the general election to incumbent Republican Senator Arlen Specter by more than 12 percentage points. It is this experience that led Edgar to become frustrated with political campaigning and money in politics, moving towards support for clean elections and campaign finance reform, which he dictated at the 2004 Democracy Matters Conference in Albany, New York.

== Later life ==
In 1990, Edgar began a ten-year term of service as President of Claremont School of Theology, Claremont, California, a graduate-professional school related to the United Methodist Church and part of the Claremont educational consortium east of Los Angeles. He assumed the role amid a period of financial difficulty for the school, and during his tenure, he oversaw an increased enrollment and endowment. From 2001 until his death, he was a member of the Greater New Jersey Annual Conference; he transferred from the California Pacific Conference.

Edgar served on the boards of several organizations, including Independent Sector, the National Coalition for Health Care, and the National Religious Partnership for the Environment. He also served on the board of directors of the Environmental and Energy Study Institute, an independent, non-profit organization that is a principal resource for Congress on environmental and energy issues.

He was an endorser of the Genocide Intervention Network.

In 2000, Edgar began a seven-year term as chief executive of the National Council of the Churches of Christ in the USA. Under his leadership, the 50-year-old NCC began to reshape its mission, focusing its energies on major initiatives in the areas of overcoming poverty, protecting the natural environment, fostering interfaith understanding, and building international peace.

Following his retirement from the NCC, he became President of Common Cause in 2007, advocating for publicly funded elections. He served in this role until his death on April 23, 2013, from a heart attack, at his home in Burke, Virginia.

== Honors and awards ==
Edgar was recognized by several national organizations for his work, including by the American Legion, Vietnam Veterans of America and the National Taxpayers Union.

U.S. House of Representatives
Preceded by Lawrence Williams	Member of the U.S. House of Representatives from Pennsylvania's 7th congressional district 1975–1987	Succeeded by Curt Weldon
Party political offices
Preceded by Pete Flaherty	Democratic nominee for U.S. Senator from Pennsylvania (Class 3); 1986	Succeeded by Lynn Yeakel
