= Eliot A. Cohen =

American political scientist

Eliot Cohen

9th Dean of the Paul H. Nitze School of Advanced International Studies
- In office 2019–2021
- Preceded by: Vali Nasr
- Succeeded by: James Steinberg

28th Counselor of the United States Department of State
- In office April 30, 2007 – January 20, 2009
- President: George W. Bush
- Preceded by: Philip D. Zelikow
- Succeeded by: Cheryl Mills

Personal details
- Born: Eliot Asher Cohen; April 3, 1956 (age 70) Boston, Massachusetts, U.S.
- Party: Independent
- Other political affiliations: Republican (until 2016)
- Education: Harvard University (BA, MA, PhD)

Military service
- Branch/service: United States Army Reserve
- Rank: Captain

Eliot Asher Cohen (born April 3, 1956) is an American political scientist. He was a counselor in the United States Department of State under Condoleezza Rice from 2007 to 2009. In 2019, Cohen was named the 9th Dean of the Paul H. Nitze School of Advanced International Studies (SAIS) at Johns Hopkins University, succeeding Vali Nasr. Before his time as dean, he directed the Strategic Studies Program at SAIS. Cohen "is one of the few teachers in the American academy to treat military history as a serious field", according to international law scholar Ruth Wedgwood. Cohen is a contributing writer at The Atlantic. He is also, with Eric Edelman, a co-host of the Shield of the Republic podcast, published by The Bulwark.

== Biography ==
Cohen grew up in Boston in a secular Jewish family. When he was in his teens his father became more observant and sent him to the Maimonides School, a Modern Orthodox Jewish day school in Brookline. Cohen received his B.A. in government at Harvard University in 1977. He went on to receive a Ph.D. from Harvard in 1982 in political science, and during his PhD training went through the Army ROTC program at Massachusetts Institute of Technology (because Harvard banned ROTC from campus in 1971; Harvard ROTC began training at MIT in 1976). He served as a military intelligence officer in the United States Army Reserve and left military service as a captain.

He was an assistant professor of government and assistant dean at Harvard University from 1982 to 1985. Following this, he taught for four years at the Naval War College in the Department of Strategy, before briefly serving in 1990 on the policy planning staff in the Office of the Secretary of Defense. In 1990, Cohen began teaching at SAIS. After the 1991 Persian Gulf War, he directed the U.S. Air Force's official four-volume survey, the Gulf War Air Power Survey, until 1993, for which he received the Air Force's Exemplary Civilian Service Award. In 1993, Paul Wolfowitz, who would later become prominent as the Deputy Secretary of Defense in the run-up to the Iraq War, became Dean of SAIS. During his brief stint at the defense policy planning staff, Cohen had worked under Wolfowitz but this was the first time they were in extended contact.

In 1997, Cohen co-founded the Project for the New American Century (PNAC), which was a center for prominent neoconservatives. He has been a member of the Defense Policy Board Advisory Committee, a committee of civilians and retired military officers that the U.S. Secretary of Defense may call upon for advice, that was instituted during the administration of President George W. Bush. He was put on the board after acquaintance Richard Perle put forward his name. Cohen has referred to the war on terrorism as "World War IV". In the run-up to the 2003 invasion of Iraq, he was a member of Committee for the Liberation of Iraq, a group of prominent persons who pressed for an invasion.

On 2 March 2007, Cohen was appointed by Secretary of State Condoleezza Rice to serve as Counselor of the State Department, replacing Philip D. Zelikow. He exited government along with his peers at the end of term for the Bush presidency.

As of March 2022, he is on the America Abroad Media advisory board.

== Political views ==
=== Statements on US foreign policy ===
Cohen was one of the early national security analyst to publicly advocate war against Iran and Iraq. Cohen's commentary during this time has been characterized by some to reflect his neoconservative leanings. He has always rejected this label to describe his views.

In a November 2001 op-ed for The Wall Street Journal, Cohen identified what he called World War IV and advocated the overthrow of Iran's government as a possible next step for the Bush administration. Cohen claimed "regime change" in Iran could be accomplished with a focus on "pro-Western and anticlerical forces" in the Middle East and suggested that such an action would be "wise, moral and unpopular (among some of our allies)". He went on to argue that such a policy was as important as the then identified goal of Osama bin Laden's capture: "The overthrow of the first theocratic revolutionary Muslim state and its replacement by a moderate or secular government, however, would be no less important a victory in this war than the annihilation of bin Laden."

Later in 2001, Cohen advocated war against Iraq once again and proceeded to outline how effortless such a military campaign would be:

After Afghanistan, what? Iraq is the big prize... One important element will be the use of the Iraqi National Congress to help foster the collapse of the regime, and to provide a replacement for it. The INC, which has received bad, and in some cases malicious treatment, from the State Department and intelligence community over the years, may not be able to do the job with U.S. air support alone.

As a result of his public statements on why a war against Iraq was necessary, Cohen was invited to appear on CNN Wolf Blitzer Reports and amongst other statements given in response to questioning from Blitzer offered the judgment:

We know that he [Saddam Hussein] supports terror. There's very solid evidence that the Iraqis were behind an attempt to assassinate President Bush's father. And we—by the way, we do know that there is a connection with the 9/11 terrorists. We do know that Mohamed Atta, the ringleader of the 9/11 terrorists, met with Iraqi intelligence in Prague. So...

In testifying to a congressional House committee later in 2002, Cohen was quoted as saying:

..the choice before the United States is a stark one, either to acquiesce in a situation which permits the regime of Saddam Hussein to restore his economy, acquire weapons of mass destruction and pose a lethal threat to his neighbors and to us, or to take action to overthrow him. In my view, the latter course, with all of its risks, is the correct one. Indeed, the dangers of failing to act in the near future are unacceptable.

In a piece for The Wall Street Journal on 6 February 2003, Cohen fervently praised the presentation given by then Secretary of State Colin Powell in which he outlined the case for military action against Iraq to the United Nations. He went on to indicate that it was time for those who doubted that the case had been proven to support the Bush administration in their efforts.

An article written for The Washington Post on 10 July 2005 raised the attention of commentators in the media and "blogosphere". The piece, an attempt to articulate Cohen's self identified roles as academic, pundit, and father, was written as his son prepared to deploy to Iraq to fight a war the elder Cohen had been calling for since early 2001. The piece ends:

There is a lot of talk these days about shaky public support for the war. That is not really the issue. Nor should cheerleading, as opposed to truth-telling, be our leaders' chief concern. If we fail in Iraq—and I don't think we will—it won't be because the American people lack heart, but because leaders and institutions have failed. Rather than fretting about support at home, let them show themselves dedicated to waging and winning a strange kind of war and describing it as it is, candidly and in detail. Then the American people will give them all the support they need. The scholar in me is not surprised when our leaders blunder, although the pundit in me is dismayed when they do. What the father in me expects from our leaders is, simply, the truth—an end to happy talk and denials of error, and a seriousness equal to that of the men and women our country sends into the fight.

External videos
- Q&A interview with Cohen on his Washington Post piece, "A Hawk Questions Himself as His Son Goes to War", July 31, 2005, C-SPAN

As a member of the Defense Policy Board Advisory Committee Cohen had also been engaged in meetings involving US President George Bush. During these meetings Cohen provided advice on strategy in the Iraq conflict.

=== View on military experience and policy-making skills ===
In 2002, Cohen defended the PNAC membership against the charge that its personnel were chicken-hawks. Cohen found unsupported the opinion that, compared to civilians, veterans possess "sheer moral authority" or "are uniquely qualified to make judgments on matters of war and peace." As an example, Cohen states:

There is no evidence that generals as a class make wiser national security policymakers than civilians. George C. Marshall, our greatest soldier statesman after George Washington, opposed shipping arms to Britain in 1940. His boss, Franklin D. Roosevelt, with nary a day in uniform, thought otherwise. Whose judgment looks better?

FDR was Woodrow Wilson's Assistant Secretary of the Navy.

=== Appointment to Department of State ===
On 2 March 2007, it was reported by The Washington Post that Cohen was to be appointed as Condoleezza Rice's "counselor" at the United States Department of State. Cohen replaced Philip D. Zelikow and said he would fill time before appointment in April 2007 by acting as a consultant for Rice.

The tone of the Washington Post article—Cohen is described as a "critic" of the Iraq war—was soon criticised. An article by Ximena Ortiz in the National Interest called Cohen's ability to do the job into question and attempted to juxtapose his previous statements on the Bush administration foreign policy with the resulting war in Iraq.

As the controversy played out in the media, a rebuttal of sorts from Ruth Wedgwood, international law scholar at Johns Hopkins University, sought to defend Cohen from criticism. Ortiz was subsequently supported in her criticism by fellow commentator at National Interest Online, Anatol Lieven, who raised the level of criticism to include Cohen's efforts as a historian and analyst as well as tackling other pronouncements on US foreign policy in the Middle East made by Cohen.

=== Mearsheimer and Walt paper ===
In March 2006, Harvard Kennedy School's academic dean Stephen M. Walt along with professor John J. Mearsheimer of the University of Chicago, both political scientists, published an academic paper titled The Israel Lobby and U.S. Foreign Policy. The paper criticizes the Israel lobby for influencing U.S. foreign policy in the Middle East away from U.S. interests and towards Israel's interests. Cohen wrote in a prominent op-ed piece in The Washington Post that the academic working paper bears all the traditional hallmarks of antisemitism: "obsessive and irrationally hostile beliefs about Jews", accusations toward Jews of "disloyalty, subversion or treachery, of having occult powers and of participating in secret combinations that manipulate institutions and governments", as well as selection of "everything unfair, ugly or wrong about Jews as individuals or a group" and equally systematical suppression of "any exculpatory information". Mearsheimer and Walt have denied Cohen's assertions as false, dishonest and ridiculous, noting that criticism of Israeli state policy and influential American advocates of that policy, such as Cohen, is not the same thing as demonization of Jewish people.

=== Chuck Hagel nomination ===
Along with a large number of other Republicans, Cohen opposed Barack Obama's prospective nomination of Republican Chuck Hagel as U.S. Secretary of Defense in late 2012. Cohen was quoted as saying:

If you have somebody there [at Defense] who's already made it clear that he does not want to engage in a confrontation with Iran, what kind of negotiating leverage do we have? ... You want to have as secretary of defense somebody who's the heavy. Somebody who's the guy who looks as if he's perfectly capable of waging war against you and happy to do it. That's just kind of elementary negotiating tactics.

=== 2014 Russian annexation of Crimea ===
Cohen wrote an op-ed piece in The Washington Post on 3 March 2014, between the ousting of Viktor Yanukovich on 22 February and the Crimean referendum on 16 March. In it, he maintains that "Putin is indeed a brutal Great Russian nationalist who understands that Russia without a belt of subservient client states is not merely a very weak power but also vulnerable to the kind of upheaval that toppled Yanukovych’s corrupt and oppressive regime." He mentions The New York Times publication of the op-ed by Putin on the Syrian chemical arms question and links to the text of the NATO accord as a token of good faith.

=== Never Trump movement ===
Cohen wrote an op-ed piece in The Washington Post on 15 November 2016 after the 2016 presidential election affirming his stance against the presidency of Donald Trump. In the piece he states:

I am a national security Never-Trumper who, after the election, made the case that young conservatives should volunteer to serve in the new administration, warily, their undated letters of resignation ready. That advice, I have concluded, was wrong. [...] My friend was seething with anger directed at those of us who had opposed Donald Trump—even those who stood ready to help steer good people to an administration that understandably wanted nothing to do with the likes of me, someone who had been out front in opposing Trump since the beginning.

Cohen also wrote an op-ed piece in The Atlantic on 29 January 2017 commenting on his distaste for Donald Trump as a person:

Many conservative foreign-policy and national-security experts saw the dangers last spring and summer, which is why we signed letters denouncing not Trump's policies but his temperament; not his program but his character. We were right. And friends who urged us to tone it down, to make our peace with him, to stop saying as loudly as we could "this is abnormal," to accommodate him, to show loyalty to the Republican Party, to think that he and his advisers could be tamed, were wrong.

In 2020, Cohen, along with over 130 other former Republican national security officials, signed a statement asserting Trump was unfit to serve another term, and "To that end, we are firmly convinced that it is in the best interest of our nation that Vice President Joe Biden be elected as the next President of the United States, and we will vote for him."

== Selected works ==
External videos
- Presentation by Cohen on Supreme Command, July 9, 2002, C-SPAN
- Booknotes interview with Cohen on Supreme Command, September 22, 2002, C-SPAN
- Washington Journal interview with Cohen on Supreme Command, January 16, 2004, C-SPAN
- Presentation by Cohen on Conquered into Liberty, November 10, 2011, C-SPAN
- Presentation by Cohen on Conquered into Liberty, March 29, 2012, C-SPAN
- Discussion with Cohen on The Big Stick, February 2, 2017, C-SPAN

- Conquered into Liberty: Two Centuries of Battles Along the Great Warpath That Made the American Way of War (Simon & Schuster 2000) ISBN 978-0-7432-4990-4
- Citizens and Soldiers: The Dilemmas of Military Service (1985)
- Military Misfortunes: The Anatomy of Failure in War (Free Press, 1990) ISBN 0-02-906060-5
- With Thomas A. Keaney, Gulf War Air Power Survey Summary Report (United States Government Printing Office, 1993) ISBN 0-16-041950-6. (Note that the full report has four parts.)
- With Keaney, Revolution in Warfare?: Air Power in the Persian Gulf (Naval Institute Press, 1995) ISBN 1-55750-131-9
- Knives, Tanks, and Missiles: Israel's Security Revolution (Washington Institute for Near East Policy, 1998) ISBN 0-944029-72-8.
- Editor with John Bayliss, et al. Strategy in the Contemporary World: Introduction to Strategic Studies (Oxford University Press, 2002) ISBN 0-19-878273-X.
- With Andrew Bacevich, War Over Kosovo (Columbia University Press, 2002) ISBN 0-231-12482-1.
- Supreme Command: Soldiers, Statesmen, and Leadership in Wartime (Free Press, 2002) ISBN 0-7432-3049-3.
- The Big Stick: the Limits of Soft Power and the Necessity of Military Force. Basic Books. 2016. ISBN 9780465044726. OCLC 958205490.
- The Strategist: How to Think About War and Politics (Princeton University Press, 2026) ISBN 978-0-691-26944-3

Government offices
| Preceded by Philip D. Zelikow | Counselor of the United States Department of State; 2007–2009 | Succeeded by Cheryl Mills |
