= Curt Weldon =

American politician (born 1947)

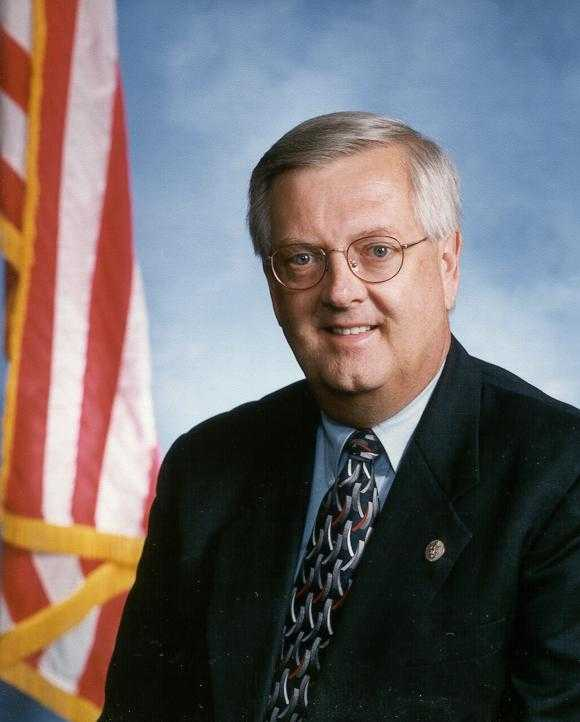

Member of the U.S. House of Representatives from Pennsylvania's 7th district
- In office January 3, 1987 – January 3, 2007
- Preceded by: Bob Edgar
- Succeeded by: Joe Sestak

Personal details
- Born: Wayne Curtis Weldon; July 22, 1947 (age 79) Marcus Hook, Pennsylvania, U.S.
- Party: Republican
- Spouse: Mary Weldon
- Education: West Chester University (BA)

Wayne Curtis Weldon (born July 22, 1947) is an American educator and politician. He served as a Republican member of the United States House of Representatives from 1987 to 2007, representing the 7th district of Pennsylvania. He was defeated in November 2006 for reelection by Joe Sestak. Weldon was vice-chair of the Armed Services Committee and the House Homeland Security Committee. He was also the co-chair of the Duma-Congress Study Group, the official inter-parliamentary relationship between the United States and Russia.

== Early life and education ==
Weldon grew up in a blue-collar family in Marcus Hook, Pennsylvania. He was the youngest of nine children. He attended West Chester University and earned a B.A. in Russian studies in 1969, making him the first in his family to graduate from college. At West Chester University, Weldon became a brother of Lambda Chi Alpha fraternity.

After graduation, Weldon was subject to the draft, with the Vietnam War ongoing. In November 2000, his office said he used student and teaching deferments during the Vietnam era, and had a low number when the draft lottery was reinstated. In July 2006, a Weldon spokesman said that Weldon "wanted to serve, but the military would not take him because of his extremely poor eyesight."

== Early political career ==
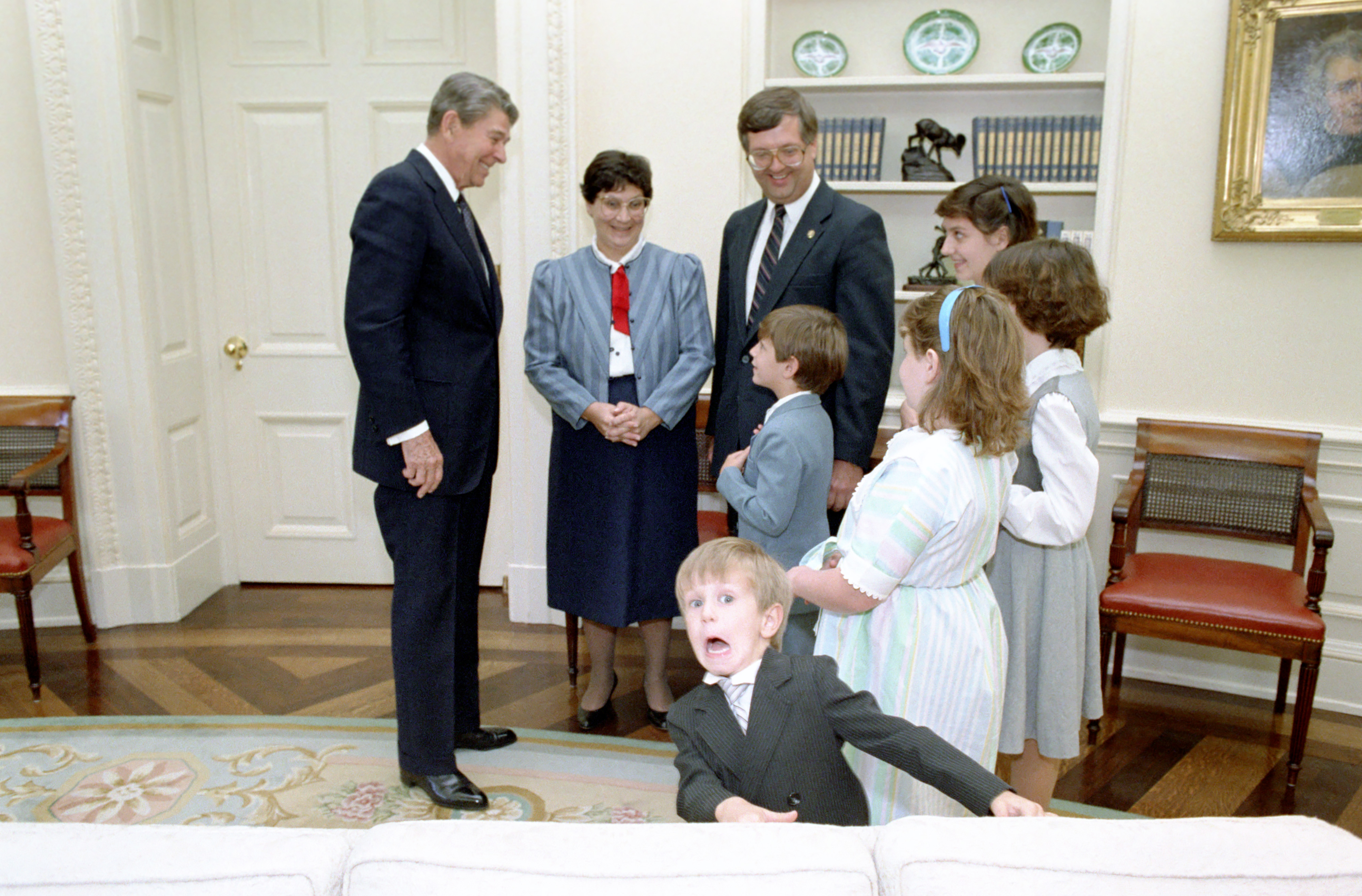
Weldon and his family visiting with President Ronald Reagan, 1987

Weldon wasn't active in politics until 1977, when he became the Mayor of Marcus Hook. Prior to that, he served as an educator in local Delaware County schools, and for the Insurance Company of North America, as well as a volunteer line officer chief for the Viscose Fire Company in Marcus Hook.

Weldon served two terms as Mayor from 1977 to 1982 and was nominated for election on both the Republican and Democratic tickets. His efforts as mayor were geared towards defending the town against the violent Pagans Motorcycle Gang.

From 1981 to 1986, Weldon served as a councilman and later chair of the Delaware County Council. Maintaining his interest in foreign affairs, he coordinated a USSR student exchange program in 1985 that continues to this day.

== Congressional campaigns ==
=== 1984–2004 ===
Weldon first ran for a seat in the U.S. House of Representatives for the 7th district of Pennsylvania in 1984 on the Republican ticket, losing to incumbent Democrat Robert W. Edgar by just 412 votes even as Ronald Reagan carried the district by over 20 points. However, Edgar did not seek re-election in 1986 but instead ran for the U.S. Senate against Arlen Specter. Weldon then ran again for Edgar's seat in 1986 and won with a comfortable margin.

Weldon's margin for re-election grew considerably since 1986, handily defeating Democratic opponents even as Delaware County, once a classic Rockefeller Republican bastion, became friendlier to Democrats at the national level. In 2000, for instance, he was re-elected with 65% of the vote even though Democratic presidential candidate Al Gore won Delaware County with 54% of the vote.

In 2004, Weldon won with 59% of the vote. By contrast, Democratic presidential candidate John Kerry got 53% of the district's vote that year. Weldon's Democratic opponent, Paul Scoles, spent $24,000 running against the nine-term incumbent; in that 2003–2004 election cycle, Weldon received nearly $900,000 in campaign contributions. Scoles entered the race in the last 90 days of the campaign, when the original Democratic candidate, Greg Philips, was called up for Reserve duty to support the Iraq War.

=== 2006 ===
Weldon's Democratic opponent in 2006 was Joe Sestak, a Vice-Admiral who retired earlier in the year after a 31-year military career. According to the Delaware County Daily Times, Sestak proved to be a capable fundraiser and had raised more money than Weldon.

In July, CQPolitics changed their rating on the race from "Republican Favored" to the more competitive "Leans Republican." On October 13, 2006, CQPolitics once again changed their rating on the race, from "Leans Republican" to "No Clear Favorite."

On October 26, 2006, American Prospect magazine reported that e-mails recently had been forwarded to the Justice Department that describe alleged efforts by official members of Weldon's staff to call Navy employees for information and negative statements about Democratic opponent Sestak. In one Pentagon email, Weldon's office is described as "calling everyone and his brother" in the Office of the Chief of Naval Operations (OPNAV) about Sestak.

On October 27, 2006, the advocacy group Campaign for America's Future began running advertisements in Pennsylvania's 7th District questioning $233,840 in campaign contributions Weldon received from drug and insurance companies, in light of his voting history.

On November 7, 2006, Weldon lost the general election, taking 44% of the vote to Sestak's 56%.

== Actions in Congress ==
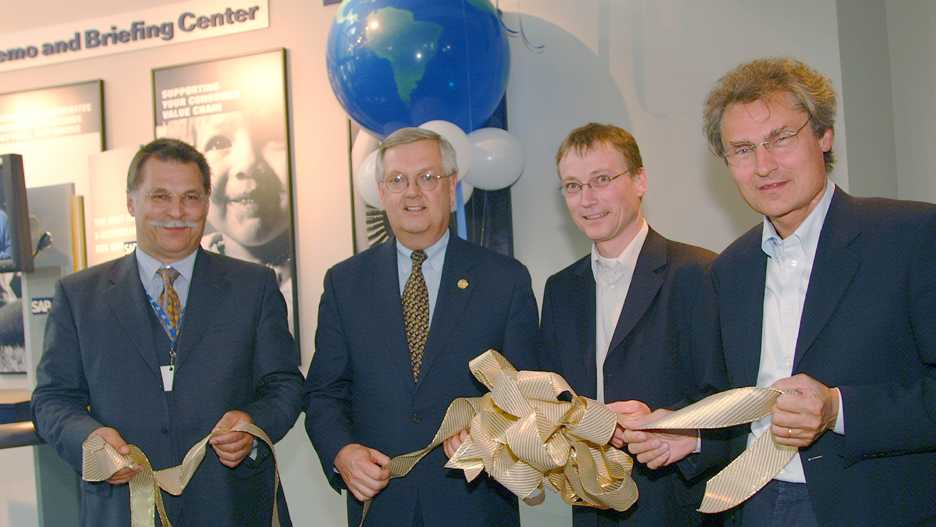
Weldon during a ribbon cutting ceremony for the SAP Global Solutions Center in 2001

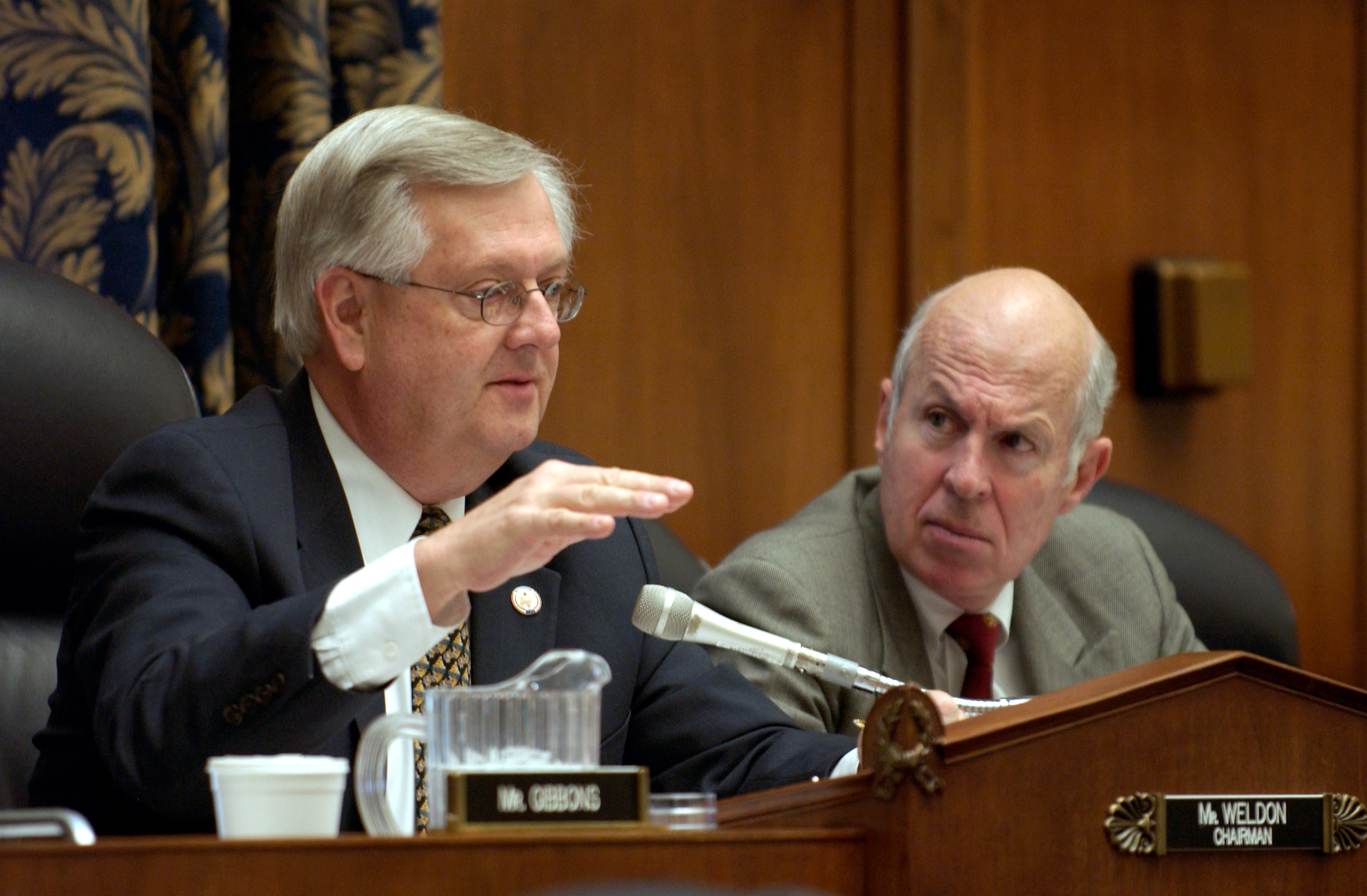
Weldon during his tenure as subcommittee chairman in 2004

Weldon's moderately conservative voting record (lifetime ACU rank: 69.9)) reflected the overwhelming Republican voter registration in Delaware County, which has varied from a low of about 62% to about 70% of registered voters 1998–2006. His voting record was slightly more conservative than the entire Pennsylvania Congressional delegation; Weldon's 2006 ACU rank was 68 vs. the average 2006 ACU rank of 57 for all 19 PA Congressmen.

=== Domestic issues ===
Weldon founded the Congressional Fire Services Caucus in 1987 and has consistently fought for increased funding for firefighters. He was the author of a bill that implemented a federal grant program for local fire departments that evolved into the Assistance to Firefighters Grant Program. He has fought for mandatory safety sprinklers in college dormitories and training of fire departments to deal with terrorism incidents involving chemical and biological weapons. At times, his alleged pork barrel spending was challenged by fiscal conservatives such as Arizona Congressman Jeff Flake; Weldon once told Flake, "Doggone it, I'm not gonna let somebody stand up here in total and complete ignorance and spout off a bunch of gobbledygook. Don't stand up on the floor and make stupid allegations because you want a headline about cutting waste. This is not waste."

Weldon co-chaired the House Oceans Caucus. In 1995, his "Oceans Agenda" legislation passed Congress, increasing funding for oceanographic research projects. Weldon was the sole House Republican on the Migratory Bird Conservation Commission, which approves funding for U.S. wildlife refuges and wetlands preservation. Weldon is a member of Global Legislators for a Balanced Environment (GLOBE), where he serves as Honorary Chairman of the Oceans Protection Task Force. Weldon also serves as the honorary United States Vice President on the Advisory Committee on the Protection of the Sea (ACOPS). In his district, Weldon secured funding for the John Heinz Wildlife Refuge in Tinicum and obtained funding for the preservation of the Paoli Battlefield, the site of a Revolutionary War battle that was slated for development.

Weldon also co-authored the Family Medical Leave Act, pushed for the extension of unemployment benefits, has consistently supported raising the minimum wage, opposed the North American Free Trade Agreement, and voted for across-the-board tax cuts. He also played a key leadership role in welfare reform in the mid-1990s.

=== Foreign policy ===
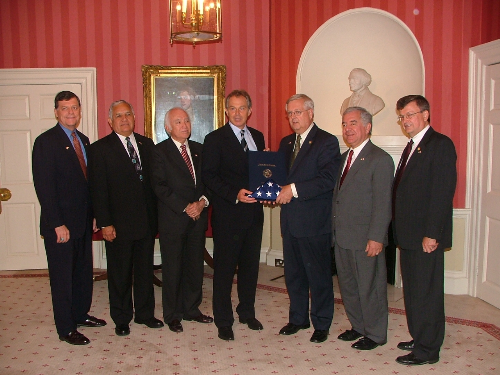
Weldon and other members of Congress with British Prime Minister Tony Blair in July 2005

In 1993, Weldon and Bob Dole, among other Republicans, advocated pulling out of Somalia after the "Blackhawk Down" failed snatch and grab mission of Mohamed Farrah Aidid cost 18 American dead.

==== Russia and China ====
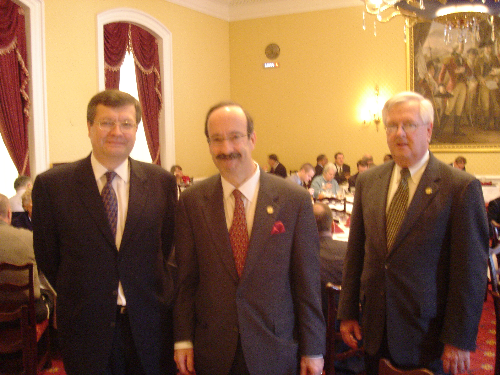
Weldon and Eliot Engel with Kostyantyn Gryshchenko in October 2005

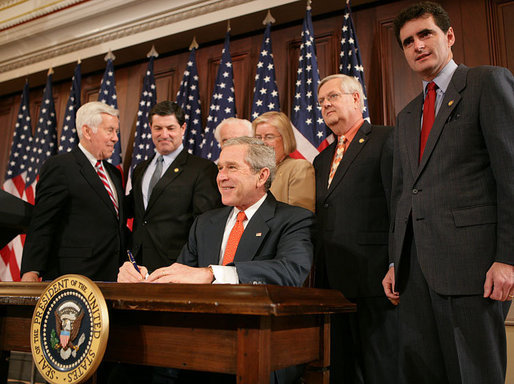
Weldon and other members of Congress watch as President George W. Bush signs H.R. 1053, to authorize the Extension of Nondiscriminatory Treatment to the Products of Ukraine in March 2006

In June 1998, Weldon served on the Select Committee on U.S. National Security and Military/Commercial Concerns with the People's Republic of China, perhaps better known as the "Cox Committee." The committee, five Republicans and four Democrats, investigated whether the Clinton Administration's waivers allowing U.S. military contractors to transfer military technology to China damaged national security. According to officials who have been briefed about its contents, the report concludes that Beijing's acquisition of secret American weapons designs was part of an intelligence collection effort that spanned 20 years, including both Republican and Democratic Administrations. It also enumerates an array of thefts from the Government's weapons labs, including classified information about seven advanced nuclear warheads, among them the W-88, the most sophisticated nuclear weapon in the American arsenal; that theft is believed to have occurred during the Reagan or Bush Administrations. The report also says that China stole design information about the neutron bomb.

Weldon made improving relations with Russia one of his key efforts in the House. He worked with Russian leaders on a variety of issues, including efforts to improve Russia's energy supply, correct environmental damage, and protect both nations from ballistic missile attack. Weldon was the co-founder of the Duma-Congress Study Group, the official parliamentary exchange between the two legislative bodies. This bilateral relationship coordinated legislative efforts in the Russian Duma and the Congress to foster a better working relationship between the two nations. In 2017, Weldon created a comprehensive framework designed to improve the state of relations between the two countries. Titled "A New Time, A New Beginning", his proposal made recommendations for cooperative efforts in eleven different areas ranging from defense and national security to space exploration and scientific research.

==== Visits to North Korea ====
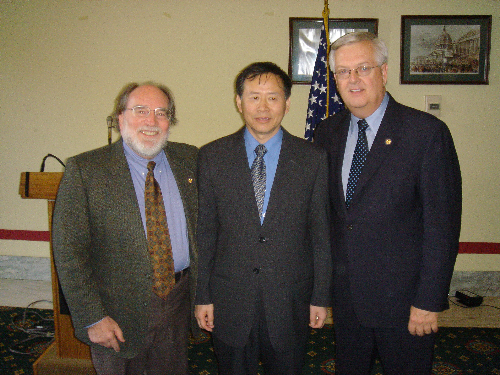
Weldon and Neil Abercrombie with Han Song-ryol in October 2005

In June 2003, Weldon lead a bipartisan Congressional delegation to North Korea. The delegation didn't go as official representatives of the White House, which had repeatedly refused North Korea's demands that the two countries meet one-on-one. The White House did know the trip was planned and did supply a military helicopter.

Weldon said that the meetings went extremely well. Weldon said he drew up an outline of how relations could be improved between the two countries, which would involve the complete nuclear disarmament of North Korea. North Korean leaders, including the vice-foreign minister who is the chief negotiator for the North, were receptive to the concept, said Weldon.

In October 2003, Weldon had planned to head a 10-member Congressional delegation to North Korea for his second visit. But two days prior to the October 25 departure date, White House Chief of Staff Andrew Card informed Weldon that the administration was "pulling all support." Weldon then wrote a 4½-page letter to President George W. Bush that said that Bush's national security team was "arrogant and disrespectful" in the way it cancelled the trip. Weldon said he would continue his efforts to dialogue with North Korean officials whether the White House supports him or not. "They can't stop me from going there", he said. "What they can do is make things supremely difficult."

In January 2005, Weldon led a six-member Congressional delegation in a three-day visit to North Korea, as well as brief stops in South Korea, China, Russia and Japan. Weldon said Pyongyang was serious about abandoning its nuclear program, but he said it wanted certain assurances from the United States — the main one being that an end to what he called "inflammatory rhetoric" from Washington.

In August 2005, Weldon went to North Korea as part of a 10-member delegation that included Ted Turner and former U.S. Ambassador to South Korea Donald Gregg.

==== Visits to Libya ====
In 2004, Weldon led two bipartisan delegations to Libya. The first visit, in January, was to establish contact with government officials. The second visit, in September, was to address their Congress (Libyan General People's Congress Great Jamahiriya).

A large picture of Weldon putting what his office said was an American flag pin on Colonel Muammar al-Gaddafi, the head of Libya, was displayed when Weldon spoke at the Sun Myung Moon coronation ceremony.

In 2011, Weldon again visited the Gaddafi-controlled Libyan capital of Tripoli as a private citizen, on the invitation of Colonel Gaddafi. He urged Colonel Gaddafi to step down due to bloodshed in the 2011 Libyan civil war. He met with several high-level members of Gaddafi's government.

==== Iraq, Iran, and terrorism ====
Weldon has frequently taken contrarian positions on such subjects as Saddam Hussein, Osama bin Laden, and pre-war Iraqi weapons of mass destruction. He has been critical of several federal agencies and of Congressional committees.

In October 2005, Weldon gave a speech on the House floor in which he described the Able Danger military intelligence program, stating they correctly identified Mohamed Atta's Brooklyn cell in January and February 2000, a year prior to the attacks. He also claimed they were repeatedly blocked by litigation from delivering their findings to the FBI in September 2000.

===== Claims of Iranian terror plot against the United States =====
In mid-2005, Weldon's book, Countdown to Terror: The Top-Secret Information that Could Prevent the Next Terrorist Attack on America ... and How the CIA Has Ignored It, was published. Weldon claimed the Iranian government was plotting a terrorist attack against the United States. Weldon accused the CIA, the Defense Intelligence Agency, the National Security Agency, and his colleagues on the House and Senate intelligence committees of ignoring his trove of information. These secrets, he says, come from "an impeccable clandestine source", whom Weldon code-names "Ali", an Iranian exile living in Paris. Much of the book consists of reproduced pages of "intelligence" memos faxed by Ali to Weldon's office between 2003 and 2004.

According to the book, Iranian-supported terrorists were plotting to fly a hijacked Canadian airliner into the Seabrook Nuclear Power Station, 40 miles outside Boston. The book also said that Iran was hiding Osama bin Laden.

"Ali" was identified in April 2005 as Fereydoun Mahdavi, a frail, elderly former minister of commerce in the government of the Shah of Iran. Mahdavi has said that the bulk of the information that he provided to Weldon originally came from Iran-Contra arms dealer Manucher Ghorbanifar.

The CIA and former intelligence officers vehemently dispute Weldon's charges. Bill Murray, the former CIA station chief in Paris, said that, after interviewing Mahdavi on several occasions and investigating his claims, the CIA determined he was lying. The CIA says that Mahdavi never gave them anything specific about Iran's weapons capability or terrorist activities. As for Ghorbanifar, he is the subject of a rare CIA "burn notice" after the agency found him to be a "fabricator" during the Iran-Contra affair.

===== Hidden weapons of mass destruction =====
Weldon supported the theory that Iraq possessed weapons of mass destruction. As late as 2006, after coalition forces in Iraq failed to find Iraqi weapons caches, Weldon insisted that Saddam Hussein's government had developed weapons of mass destruction.

Dave Gaubatz, a former Air Force special investigator who was as a civilian employee in Iraq in 2003, says that while in Iraq, he acquired what he considered reliable information about WMD caches in four locations that had gas and chemical weapons that were recently produced. He could not get U.S. military officials to look into the matter, so he eventually contacted Weldon and Representative Peter Hoekstra, head of the House Intelligence Committee, to share his information and to try to get them to pressure the Defense Department and intelligence agencies to do the WMD searches in four locales.

Instead, Gaubatz said, Weldon discussed a Hoekstra-Weldon trip to Iraq, under the guise of visiting the troops, that would detour to one of the locales. Once there, Gaubatz said, the congressmen planned to persuade the U.S. military commander to lend them the equipment and men to go digging for the cache. He said that Weldon made it clear he didn't want word leaked to the Pentagon, to intelligence officials, or to Democratic congressmen.

Gaubatz said that "They even worked out how it would go. If there was nothing there, nothing would be said. If the site had been [scavenged], nothing would be said. But, if it was still there, they would bring the press corps out." After a May 4, 2006 meeting, according to Gaubatz, he called a reporter at The Washington Times, who called Weldon's office to get confirmation. That inquiry, Gaubatz said, scuttled the project.

A spokesman for Hoekstra denied that Hoekstra intended to take an expedition to Iraq. Weldon's office refused to comment.

=== March 2004 coronation ===
Weldon was one of six "Congressional Co-Chairs" for a Sun Myung Moon event on March 23, 2004, in the Dirksen Senate Office Building, which was described in the invitation as being for the "Interreligious and International Peace Council." The IIPC is a program of the Universal Peace Federation. Weldon's office initially denied that he attended the event and when shown the invitation showing him as a cosponsor said that he had been unable to attend the event. They retracted those claims upon being shown photos proving his attendance, claiming that his participation was "limited to his attendance." Investigative reporter John Gorenfeld then found a photo depicting Weldon as giving the opening "congratulatory remarks" from the stage. Weldon gave a speech about his recent trip to Libya in front of a photo of him pinning an award on Muammar al-Gaddafi. A spokesman for Weldon then said he "was not there for the crowning" and that "If we had known that Reverend Moon was going to attend the event, be crowned and make an unbelievably interesting speech, the congressman likely would not have attended."

== Controversies ==
=== 2006 investigation ===
In 2006 Weldon faced investigation by the Justice Department's Public Integrity Section for suspected unlawful ties to two Russian companies and two Serbian citizens, when in a filing with the Federal Election Commission Weldon's campaign committee reported that it transferred $70,000 to the "Weldon Legal Expense Trust". When reports surfaced of this in September 2006, Russ Caso, Weldon's chief of staff, said that the congressman and his staff were unaware of any investigation.

The FBI and Justice Department's investigations were triggered by a 2004 article in the Los Angeles Times reporting on Weldon and his daughter's links to the Russians and Serbians. On October 16, 2006, FBI agents raided the home of Weldon's daughter as well as five other locations of Weldon associates in Pennsylvania and Florida as part of the investigation. According to an article in the October 17, 2006, edition of The New York Times, "investigators are trying to determine whether Mr. Weldon misused his official position to help his daughter's company obtain lobbying contracts from foreign clients and helped steer contracts to favored firms." On October 16, 2006, Weldon acknowledged he was under investigation. Before Weldon's public confirmation, an unnamed federal law enforcement official mentioned in press accounts said that Weldon had not yet been told about the inquiry.

A grand jury was impaneled as part of the investigation. Evidence reportedly had been obtained through wiretaps of Washington area cellphones. On October 19, 2006, The Philadelphia Inquirer reported that Weldon has in his possession a letter from the House Ethics Committee that he claims "closed the case" about whether he used his influence to help his daughter. Weldon said he has not decided whether or not to release the letter. Although emails from the Weldon campaign quoted by the Inquirer claim the Ethics panel "closed the case in 2004", the article reveals the matter was not dismissed until September 29, 2006. The Ethics Committee action is not binding on the Department of Justice investigation.

On December 22, 2006, the Los Angeles Times reported that a federal grand jury had subpoenaed Weldon's congressional records prior to the November elections. Because a member must notify House leadership promptly if they receive subpoenas while the House is in session to be entered into the Congressional Record, Weldon may have violated House rules depending on when he received the subpoenas. On July 17, 2007, The Washington Post reported that, as of Spring 2007, federal investigators were continuing to examine Weldon's official actions taken on behalf of his daughter's lobbying clients. The same article noted that Weldon had spent at least $30,000 in legal fees and related investigatory expenses as a result of the probe.

Weldon was never charged in the incident, however the USA Today claimed in 2008 that the incident had cost him his re-election.

=== Lobbying controversies ===
In September 2006, the Citizens for Responsibility and Ethics in Washington (CREW) released its second annual report on members of Congress with ethics issues, titled "Beyond DeLay: The 20 Most Corrupt Members of Congress (and five to watch)". Weldon was one of the 20. The organization said "His ethics issues stem from using his position to financially benefit his children and a family friend."

In response, Weldon spokesman Michael Puppio said there is "nothing illegal or improper about any of the actions mentioned" in the CREW report. He said the organization is a "front group for liberal Democrats who have a partisan ax to grind against Republicans."

In January 2006, the Los Angeles Times reported that Cecilia Grimes, 40, who calls herself a longtime family friend of Weldon, was the senior partner in a two-person lobbying firm located in Media, Pennsylvania, where she is realtor. The lobbying firm has clients from as far away as California with business that involves one or both of the House committees that Weldon is a member of.

Grimes told the Times she has known Weldon for about 15 years. "I coached one of his kids in junior high school", she said, declining to elaborate. In 2000, she was his real estate agent in the purchase of a house in Pennsylvania. She has been lobbying since March 2003, when she opened a firm called CC Nexus LLC — now incorporated as Grimes and Young. Grimes' partner is Cynthia Young, 28, a lawyer who lives two houses from Weldon. Her husband, Robert J. Young, worked as a paid staff aide for four months on Weldon's 2004 re-election campaign. He is the son of U.S. Representative Bill Young (R-FL).

Grimes has signed up at least eight corporate clients, four of which are located in Weldon's district. The companies are mostly small firms seeking federal defense and domestic security funding. Among the most recent clients signed by Grimes and Young is Oto Melara, a subsidiary of Italian defense company Finmeccanica, the firm that employs Kim Weldon. On June 1, 2005, the company agreed to pay Grimes $20,000 annually. Grimes was put in touch with Oto Melara by Weldon's chief of staff, Russ Caso. But, Grimes said in an interview, her employment was not because of Weldon. "That's ridiculous", she said.

Another client is Advanced Ceramics Research Inc., a Tucson, Arizona firm. Grimes lobbied about a dozen members of Congress, including Weldon, for a $3 million contract in 2005, which became the firm's first funding from a defense appropriations bill. The firm has since won a combined $43.5 million in Navy contracts and congressional funding. More than $5 million came from the Naval Air Systems Command, an agency overseen by Weldon's subcommittee.

Grimes said that despite a lack of Washington experience, she has skills for lobbying. "It's all about networking and follow-up", she said. "My clients like my company, and that has nothing to do with Curt."

An additional lobbyist Stefanie Reiser worked from January 2000 to late 2005 for Weldon, handling fund-raising duties for Weldon's campaign committee and for his political action committee, Committee for a United Republican Team (CURT PAC). She earned $54,659 as a fundraiser for Weldon's campaign committee, and was paid at least $90,000 by CURT PAC for fundraising and reimbursements for travel, lodging and office supplies.

Prior to working for Weldon, Reiser was a lobbyist for Chambers Associates and served as former California Governor Pete Wilson's representative in Washington. She registered as a lobbyist for Novavax, Inc., a company seeking federal funding for a vaccine, on November 13, 2001; the company paid her $20,000. On December 6, 2001, Weldon and three other members of Congress held a briefing in which they and researchers from Novavax spoke of the need for a vaccine similar to the one Novavax was working on. On December 24, 2001, Reiser donated $250 to Curt PAC, describing herself as "Self-employed/political fundraiser".

=== Use of campaign funds ===
Between 1998 and 2006, Weldon spent about $80,000 of campaign treasury funds on restaurant meals. During the same period, Weldon also spent about $30,000 of campaign funds on hotels. He also spent $1,698 for a personal computer, delivered to his home; $4,618 for landscaping, paid to a company owned by a campaign contributor; and $13,000 in unitemized personal reimbursements during that period.

Congressional ethics rules say that campaign funds should be used for "bona fide campaign or political purposes". Weldon's attorney, William B. Canfield, said that ethics rules are "entirely amorphous", and that "you may think it's a big loophole, but he's allowed to spend money that way."

=== Conviction of former aide ===
In December 2007, a former Weldon aide pleaded guilty for failing to report $19,000 in income that his wife made for doing work for a nonprofit company tied to Weldon.

== Post-Congressional career ==
After his election defeat in November 2006, Weldon joined Defense Solutions, headquartered in Exton, Pennsylvania, as the company's chief strategic officer.

Additionally, Weldon joined the advisory board of Novo Energies Corporation, an alternative energy company converting used tires and plastic into energy.

In a 2025 interview with Tucker Carlson, Weldon alleged that the World Trade Center 7, which collapsed during the September 11 attacks, was destroyed as the result of a controlled demolition, and that the Bush administration had covered up the government's role in the September 11th attacks. Weldon further claimed that the Bush administration had ordered the FBI to raid his daughter's home in retaliation for Weldon claiming the government had foreknowledge of 9/11. Senator Ron Johnson endorsed Weldon's claims and called for a new congressional commission on 9/11 which would involve Weldon.

2025 Tucker Carlson/Weldon Interview

== See also ==
- WMD theories in the aftermath of the 2003 Iraq War
- Timeline of investigations into Donald Trump and Russia

U.S. House of Representatives
Preceded by Robert W. Edgar	Member of the U.S. House of Representatives from Pennsylvania's 7th congressional district 1987–2007	Succeeded by Joseph A. Sestak
U.S. order of precedence (ceremonial)
Preceded by Robert A. Borski as Former U.S. Representative	Order of precedence of the United States as Former U.S. Representative	Succeeded by Chaka Fattah as Former U.S. Representative
