= Operation Dark Heart =

Book by Anthony Shaffer

- Cover of the first edition
- Author: Anthony Shaffer
- Language: English
- Genre: Memoir
- Publisher: Thomas Dunne Books
- Publication date: 2010
- Publication place: United States
- Media type: Print (hardcover)
- Pages: 320
- ISBN: 978-0-312-61217-7
- OCLC: 526077073

Operation Dark Heart: Spycraft and Special Ops on the Frontlines of Afghanistan and the Path to Victory is a 2010 memoir by retired United States Army Reserve intelligence officer Lt. Col. Anthony Shaffer. The book details Shaffer's five months in Afghanistan in 2003 as a civilian Defense Intelligence Agency officer. Before redactions, the book contained names of intelligence officers and described clandestine operations, including "N.S.A.'s voice surveillance system". The United States Department of Defense went to extreme lengths in an attempt to censor information in the book after it had already been printed.

U.S. Army Reserve reviewers suggested modest changes in the original manuscript in January 2010. St. Martin's Press planned an August 31, 2010 release. When the Defense Intelligence Agency read the manuscript and shared it with the Central Intelligence Agency, the National Security Agency and the United States Special Operations Command in July, they identified around 250 pages that they claimed contained classified information. The first, uncensored printing of 9,500 copies was purchased for $47,300 in early September and destroyed by the publisher at the request of the Pentagon. A second, censored printing was released in late September. However, because 60 to 70 unredacted advance copies were distributed, the contents of the censored passages are known. The Pentagon's attempt to keep the information secret has attracted more attention to the book and increased its sales.

Shaffer sued the Department of Defense for the right to print an unredacted version in December 2010. In 2013, the Pentagon reversed its decision and declared 198 of 433 redactions to be properly declassified. A U.S. district judge ruled in April 2015 that Shaffer's public testimony to Congress in 2006 was permissible to be included in the book in any subsequent printing. However, the judge ruled other information in the original manuscript was properly classified and not allowed to be included. This included the unredacted version of the narrative from Shaffer's Bronze Star Medal.

The book also contains Shaffer's allegations that the DIA's Able Danger program identified hijacker Mohamed Atta before the September 11 attacks. A report of an investigation by the United States Senate Select Committee on Intelligence published in 2006 states that Able Danger "did not identify Mohamed Atta or any other 9/11 hijacker at any time prior to September 11, 2001."

== Publication of unredacted text ==
On September 18, 2010, The New York Times published, with commentary, the plain text and censored versions of page 26 of the book.

On September 29, 2010, the Federation of American Scientists Project on Government Secrecy posted a brief article analyzing the redactions and criticizing their quality, and also posted side-by-side comparisons of pages xvi, xvii, 13, 30, 55, 56, 76, 195, 242, 257, and the first page of Chapter 25. On October 5, 2010, they published a side-by-side comparison of the book's index.

On October 4, 2010, the Army Times published an analysis of ten redactions in the book.

== See also ==
- Censorship in the United States
- Streisand effect
- War in Afghanistan (2001–2021)
