= Anthony Shaffer (intelligence officer) =

United States Army officer

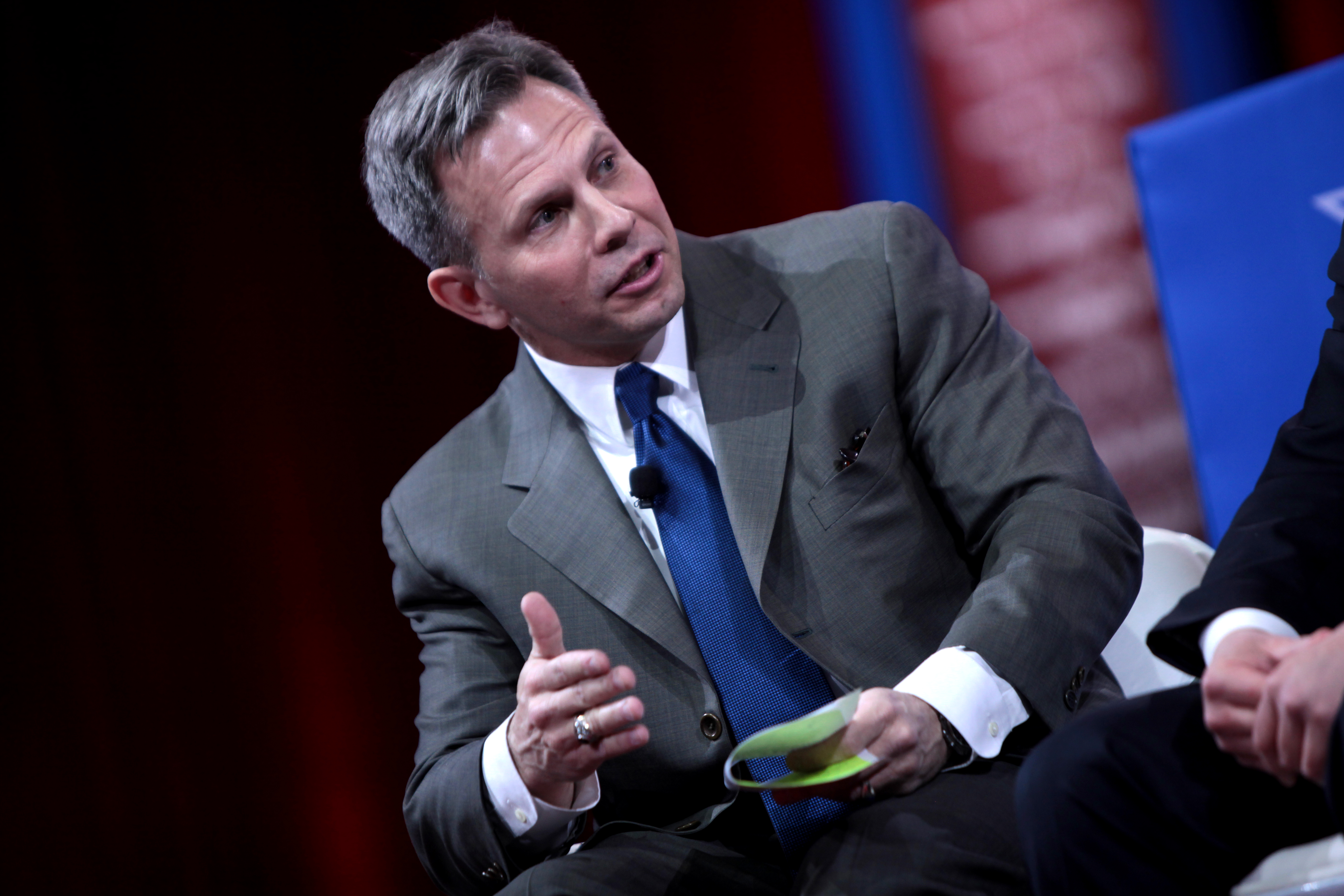
- Born: 1962 (age 63–64)
- Education: Officer Candidate School (1982); Wright State University (1986)
- Known for: Able Danger controversy Operation Dark Heart (Book)

Anthony Shaffer (born 1962) is a former U.S. Army Reserve lieutenant colonel who became known for his claims about mishandled intelligence before the September 11 attacks, and for the censoring of his ghost written book Operation Dark Heart. Shaffer was a member of the Able Danger project, having joined in 1999.

Following a Defense Intelligence Agency investigation into Shaffer, his access to classified information was revoked in September 2005 and his security clearance was revoked in February 2006. That revocation essentially ended Shaffer's career as an intelligence officer, both at DIA and in the Army Reserve. Shaffer is currently the president of the London Center for Policy Research.

== 9/11 hijacker claims ==
Shaffer alleged that the U.S. Defense Intelligence Agency (DIA) failed to properly pass on intelligence on 9/11 hijacker Mohamed Atta. Shaffer's allegations subsequently became known as the Able Danger controversy. In October 2003 Shaffer told the 9/11 Commission staff director, Philip D. Zelikow, that in 2000, a DIA data-mining program known as Able Danger had uncovered two of the three terrorist cells which the FBI determined committed 9/11. Shaffer reportedly told Zelikow that DIA leadership declined to share this information with the FBI because military lawyers expressed concerns about the legality of doing so. Shaffer also asserted that he briefed Director of Central Intelligence George Tenet on three occasions regarding his unit's activities.

The 9/11 Commission Report did not mention Shaffer's allegations, but in 2005 and 2006, the chairman of the House Select Intelligence Committee, Rep. Curt Weldon, publicized Shaffer's allegations in public statements and hearings. A Time magazine article dated August 14, 2005, reported that Weldon was no longer sure that Atta's name was on the chart created by Able Danger that he had handed to then-Deputy National Security Advisor Stephen Hadley in 2001, days after the 9/11 attacks. On December 22, 2006, a 16-month investigation by the Senate Intelligence Committee concluded that Able Danger, "did not identify Mohamed Atta or any other 9/11 hijacker at any time prior to September 11, 2001". The Defense Department's inspector general (DoD OIG) came to a similar conclusion.

While Shaffer was stripped of his security clearance, and placed on indefinite unpaid suspension, the investigation of the Defense Department's inspector general concluded that "DIA officials did not reprise against LTC Shaffer, in either his civilian or military capacity, for making disclosures regarding Able Danger". Investigations by both the Defense Department's inspector general and the Senate Intelligence Committee concluded that Able Danger did not identify any 9/11 hijacker before September 11, 2001.

== Censored memoirs ==
With the help of ghostwriter and researcher Jacqueline Salmon, Shaffer published memoirs of his time as a reports officer in Afghanistan in book titled Operation Dark Heart. The Defense Department bought and destroyed 10,000 copies of the book's first, uncensored run, before allowing the release of a second, censored printing with redactions on approximately 250 pages.

== Later career ==
Shaffer was appointed in the summer of 2013 as a senior fellow to the London Center for Policy Research. He co-wrote a novel with William H. Keith, The Last Line, which was released in June 2013. Shaffer was a member of Donald Trump's 2020 campaign advisory board.

Shaffer won an election for Chowan County, North Carolina County Commissioner in November 2024.
