= Philip Zelikow =

American diplomat and international relations scholar (born 1954)

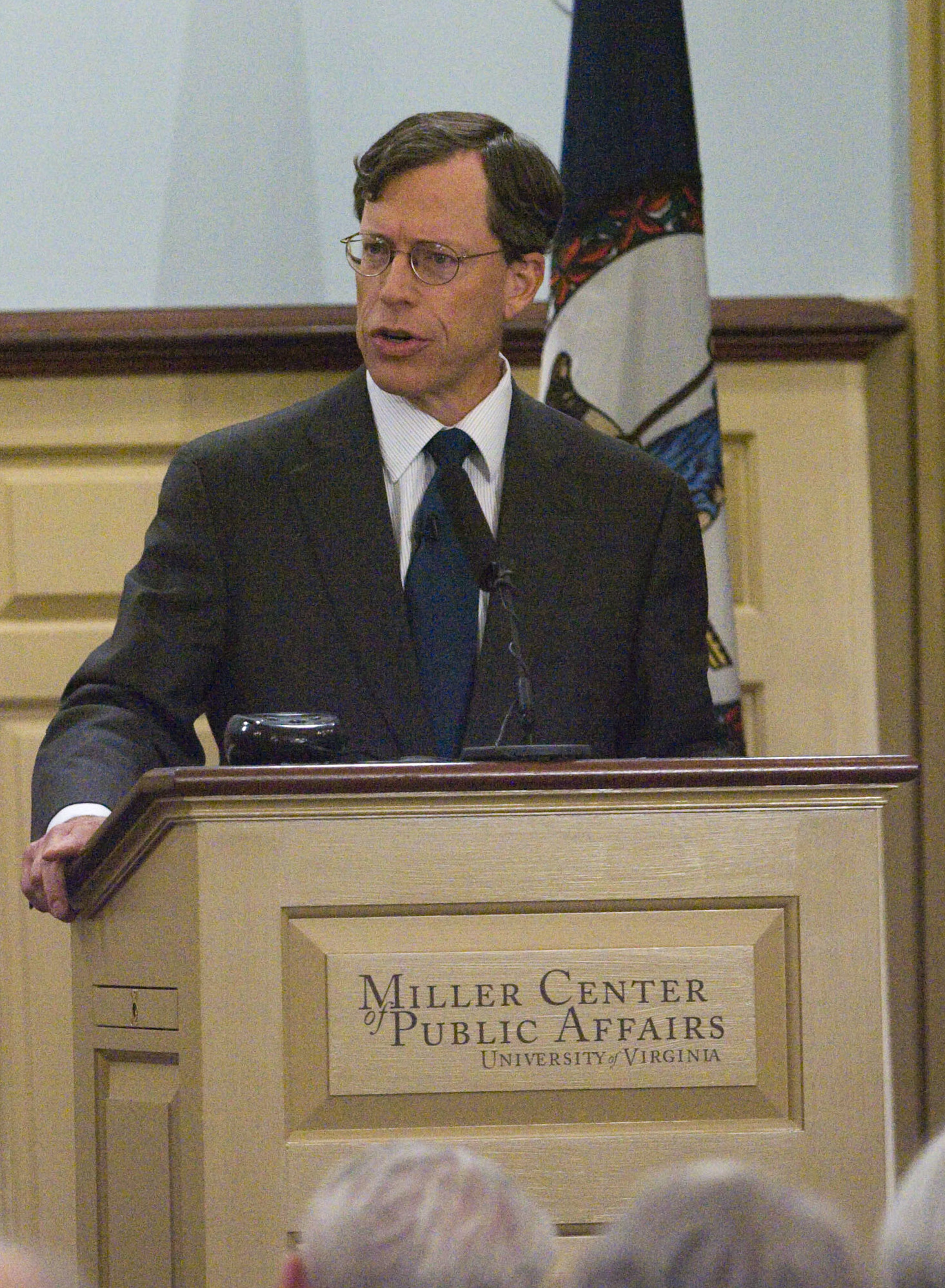

27th Counselor of the United States Department of State
- In office February 1, 2005 – January 2, 2007
- President: George W. Bush
- Preceded by: Wendy Sherman
- Succeeded by: Eliot A. Cohen

Personal details
- Born: Philip David Zelikow; September 21, 1954 (age 72) New York City, New York, U.S.
- Education: University of Redlands (BA); University of Houston (JD); Tufts University (MA PhD)

Philip David Zelikow (/ˈzɛlɪkoʊ/; born 21 September 1954) is an American diplomat and international relations scholar.

He has worked as the executive director of the 9/11 Commission, director of the Miller Center of Public Affairs at the University of Virginia, and counselor of the United States Department of State.

He is the Botha-Chan Senior Fellow at Stanford University's Hoover Institution after serving for 25 years as the White Burkett Miller Professor of History at the University of Virginia. In the fall of 2009 he was American Academy in Berlin Axel Springer Fellow.

== Education ==
Zelikow received a BA in history and political science from the University of Redlands, a JD from the University of Houston Law Center (where he was an editor of the law review), and a MALD and PhD in international relations from the Fletcher School of Law and Diplomacy at Tufts University.

== Career ==
=== Academic and federal government positions ===
After practicing law in the early 1980s, Zelikow turned toward the field of national security. He was adjunct professor of national security affairs at the Naval Postgraduate School in Monterey, California in 1984–1985.

He joined the United States Department of State through the standard examination process for the foreign service as a career civil servant. As a foreign service officer, he served overseas at the U.S. mission to the conventional arms control talks in Vienna, at the State Department's 24-hour crisis center, and on the secretariat staff for Secretary of State George P. Shultz, during the second Reagan administration (1985–1989).

In 1989, in the George H. W. Bush administration, Zelikow was detailed to the National Security Council, where he was involved as a senior White House staffer in the diplomacy surrounding the German reunification and the diplomatic settlements accompanying the end of the Cold War in Europe. During the first Gulf War, he aided President Bush, National Security Advisor Brent Scowcroft, and Secretary of State James Baker in diplomatic affairs related to the coalition. He co-authored, with Condoleezza Rice, the book Germany Unified and Europe Transformed: A Study in Statecraft (1995), an academic study of the politics of reunification.

In 1991, Zelikow left the NSC to go to Harvard University. From 1991 to 1998, he was associate professor of Public Policy and co-director of Harvard's Intelligence and Policy Program, at Harvard Kennedy School.

In 1998, Zelikow moved to the University of Virginia, where until February 2005 he directed the nation's largest center on the American presidency. He served as director of the Miller Center of Public Affairs and, as White Burkett Miller Professor of History, held an endowed chair. The center launched a project to transcribe and annotate the previously secret tapes made during the Kennedy, Johnson and Nixon presidencies.

In November 1998, Zelikow co-authored, "Catastrophic Terrorism: Tackling the New Danger" for Foreign Affairs magazine. He wrote, "Like Pearl Harbor, the event would divide our future into a before and after. The United States might respond with draconian measures scaling back civil liberties, allowing wider surveillance of citizens, detention of suspects, and the use of deadly force. More violence could follow either future terrorist attacks or U.S. counterattacks. Belatedly, Americans would judge their leaders negligent for not addressing terrorism more urgently."

In September 2002, a year after 9/11, Zelikow authored, "The National Security Strategy of The United States of America". Though some have alleged that Zelikow therefore outlined the U.S. pre-emptive war doctrine that 6 months later would be used against Iraq, in fact Zelikow had objected to this language and this part of the drafting was done by others.

In January 2003, Zelikow was appointed executive director of the 9/11 Commission. Following an appointment at the Department of State from 2005 to 2007 during the Bush administration, Zelikow returned to academics at the University of Virginia. In 2011, he was appointed Associate Dean of the Graduate School of Arts & Sciences. He has been instrumental in restructuring the College of Arts & Sciences. Also in 2011, Zelikow was appointed by President Barack Obama to the President's Intelligence Advisory Board.

=== Commissions and committees ===
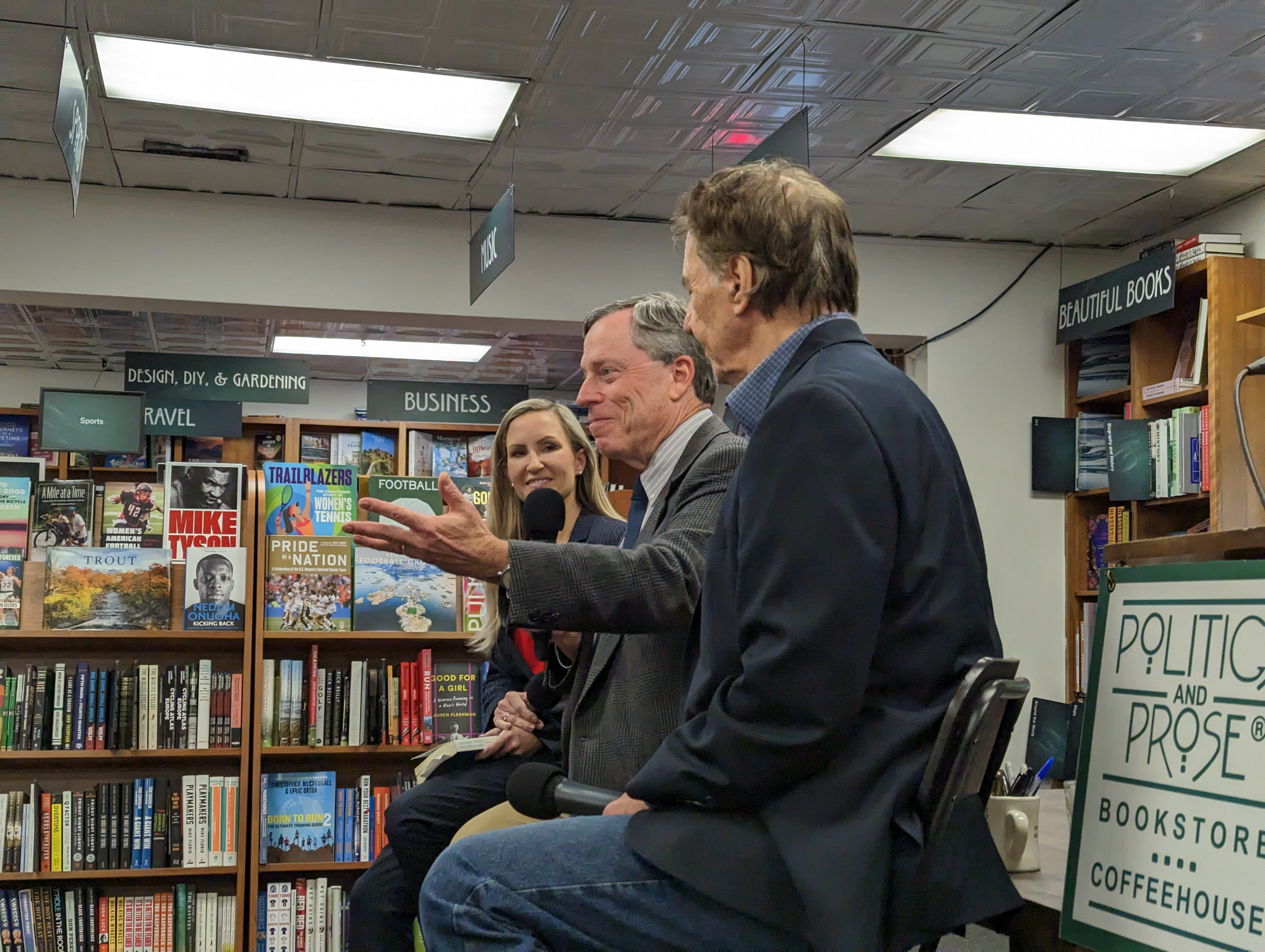
Zelikow participating in a 2023 panel at Politics and Prose on the COVID-19 pandemic

==== Bush transition team ====
In late 2000 and early 2001, Zelikow served on President Bush's transition team. After George W. Bush took office, Zelikow was named to a position on the President's Foreign Intelligence Advisory Board [PFIAB], and worked on other task forces and commissions as well. He directed the bipartisan National Commission on Federal Election Reform, created after the 2000 election and chaired by former presidents Jimmy Carter and Gerald Ford, along with Lloyd Cutler and Bob Michel. This commission's recommendations led directly to congressional consideration and enactment into law of the Help America Vote Act of 2002.

==== Markle Task Force on Security ====
In 2002, Zelikow became the executive director of the Markle Task Force on National Security in the Information Age. The Task Force comprises a diverse and bipartisan group of experienced policymakers, senior executives from the information technology industry, public interest advocates, and experts in privacy, intelligence, and national security. The Markle Task Force seeks to inform the policy judgments and investments of the federal, state and local governments in the collection and use of information as it relates to national security. The Task Force's reports and recommendations have been codified through two laws (IRPTA 2004 and the Implementing 9/11 Commission Report Act 2007) and several presidential directives.

==== Executive director of the 9/11 Commission ====
Zelikow was appointed executive director of the 9/11 Commission (National Commission on Terrorist Attacks Upon the United States), whose work included examination of the conduct of presidents Clinton and George W. Bush and their administrations prior to and on September 11, 2001. Zelikow's prior involvement with the administration of George W. Bush led to opposition from the 9/11 Family Steering Committee, citing the obvious conflict of interest of having previously worked on the Bush transition team. The commission's Republican chair and Democratic vice-chair strongly defended Zelikow, both at the time and later.

In response to the concerns, Zelikow had agreed to recuse himself from any investigation matters pertaining to the National Security Council's transition from the Clinton to Bush administrations, which Zelikow had helped manage.

Zelikow's work on the commission was attacked by some on both the right and the left. From the right, Zelikow was blamed for the commission's finding that Iraq had not been behind the 9/11 attacks. From the other side, a book attacking Zelikow's work quoted anonymous staff members of the 9/11 Commission as having distrusted Zelikow, considering him to be a "White House mole" in view of his being a close confidant of National Security Adviser Condoleezza Rice and his having worked in several high level capacities in the George W. Bush administration. Outraged by this attack, both commissioners and staff rallied publicly to defend Zelikow's management of the staff and the integrity of the report. The much-acclaimed report was a finalist for the National Book Award.

==== Rice national security strategy project ====
In Rise of the Vulcans (2004), James Mann reports that when Richard Haass, a senior aide to Secretary of State Colin Powell and the director of policy planning at the State Department, drafted an overview of America's national security strategy following the September 11, 2001 attacks, Dr. Rice, the national security advisor, "ordered that the document be completely rewritten. She thought the Bush administration needed something bolder, something that would represent a more dramatic break with the ideas of the past. Rice turned the writing over to her old colleague, University of Virginia Professor Philip Zelikow." One criticism of this document, issued on September 17, 2002, is that it is supposed to have been a significant document in an alleged Bush administration doctrine of preemptive war. However, in the drafting of this document Zelikow had opposed the proposed language using preemption in the context of how to deal with weapons of mass destruction.

==== Rework America ====
In 2014–15, while on leave from the University of Virginia and working for the Markle Foundation, Zelikow helped lead a Foundation-sponsored group of prominent Americans called "Rework America." The group developed arguments and ideas on how to use the digital revolution to enlarge economic opportunity for all Americans. The group published its ideas in "America's Moment: Creating Opportunity in the Connected Age."

=== George W. Bush administration ===
Zelikow's role in the second Iraq war is discussed at some length in Bob Woodward's State of Denial, which presents him as an internal critic of the way the war was being conducted in 2005 and 2006, and as an originator of the alternative approach termed "clear, hold, and build." He is named by sources such as Jack Goldsmith's The Terror Presidency as an internal critic of the treatment of terrorist captives, and there was wide attention given to an address he made on this subject after leaving office in April 2007.

Based on speeches and internal memos, some political analysts believe that Zelikow disagreed with aspects of the Bush administration's Middle Eastern policy.

As Counselor to Secretary of State Rice, Zelikow opposed the Bush administration Torture Memos. In 2006, Zelikow wrote a memorandum warning that the abuse of prisoners through so-called "enhanced interrogation" could constitute war crimes. Bush administration officials ignored his recommendations, and tried to collect all copies of the memo and destroy them. Jane Mayer, author of The Dark Side, quotes Zelikow as predicting that "America's descent into torture will in time be viewed like the Japanese internments", in that "(f)ear and anxiety were exploited by zealots and fools."

== Bibliography ==
=== Books ===
Philip Zelikow has co-written many books. He wrote one with Joseph Nye and David C. King on Why People Don’t Trust Government. Most of the following books were also co-written by Zelikow:

- Philip D. Zelikow with Condoleezza Rice, Germany Unified and Europe Transformed: A Study in Statecraft Harvard University Press, 1995, hardcover, 520 pages, ISBN 0-674-35324-2; trade paperback, 1997, 520 pages, ISBN 0-674-35325-0
- Philip D. Zelikow with Graham T. Allison, Essence of Decision: Explaining the Cuban Missile Crisis 2nd edition Longman, 1999. 440 pages, ISBN 0-321-01349-2
- Philip D. Zelikow with Ernest R. May, The Kennedy Tapes: Inside the White House During the Cuban Missile Crisis Harvard University Press, 1997, 728 pages, ISBN 0-674-17926-9
- Philip D. Zelikow, American Military Strategy: Memos to a President (Aspen Policy Series) W.W. Norton & Company, 2001, 206 pages, ISBN 0-393-97711-0
- Philip D. Zelikow with Condoleezza Rice, To Build a Better World: Choices to End the Cold War and Create a Global Commonwealth Twelve, 2019. 528 pages, ISBN 1-538-76468-7
- Philip D. Zelikow, The Road Less Traveled: The Secret Battle to End the Great War, 1916-1917 (PublicAffairs, 2021).
- The Covid Crisis Group (April 25, 2023). Lessons from the Covid War: An Investigative Report. PublicAffairs. ISBN 978-1-5417-0380-3. "Danielle Allen • John M. Barry • John Bridgeland • Michael Callahan • Nicholas A. Christakis • Doug Criscitello • Charity Dean • Victor Dzau • Gary Edson • Ezekiel Emanuel • Ruth Faden • Baruch Fischhoff • Margaret "Peggy" Hamburg • Melissa Harvey • Richard Hatchett • David Heymann • Kendall Hoyt • Andrew Kilianski • James Lawler • Alexander J. Lazar • James Le Duc • Marc Lipsitch • Anup Malani • Monique K. Mansoura • Mark McClellan • Carter Mecher • Michael Osterholm • David A. Relman • Robert Rodriguez • Carl Schramm • Emily Silverman • Kristin Urquiza • Rajeev Venkayya • Philip Zelikow"

=== Articles ===
- Philip Zelikow, "The Atrophy of American Statecraft: How to Restore Capacity for an Age of Crisis", Foreign Affairs, vol. 103, no. 1 (January/February 2024), pp. 56–72. In practical politics, "Saying what to do is the easy part. Designing how to do it is the hard part. [Italics added.] ... The 'how' is the 'craft' in statecraft. Most of what the U.S. government does is distributing money and set[ting] rules. Relatively few parts of [the government] mount policy operations, especially diplomatic ones. Doing so requires complex teamwork.... The limited supply of effective U.S. policymaking was demonstrated tragically during the COVID-19 outbreak, when the world failed to create a global alliance to fight a global pandemic." (p. 57.) "Judged by its human and economic toll, the COVID-19 pandemic was a global war. More than 20 million people died.... [T]he so-called pandemic playbook [that had earlier been] prepared by the Obama administration did not actually diagram any plays. There was no 'how.'" (p. 64.)

== Affiliations ==
Zelikow was a member of the Global Development Program Advisory Panel, Gates Foundation.

Government offices
Preceded by Wendy Sherman	Counselor of the United States Department of State; February 1, 2005 – January 2, 2007	Succeeded by Eliot A. Cohen
