= Joseph Slawinski =

American sculptor

Joseph Slawinski (November 27, 1905 - 1983) was a noted sgraffito artist and sculptor. A professor at the Fine Arts Academy in Warsaw, he emigrated to the United States in the early 60s and worked extensively in western New York.

== Life ==
Joseph Slawinski was born in Warsaw, Poland. In addition to his regular schooling, he took evening night classes prior to attending the School of Decorative Arts. He also interned with the painter Władysław Drapiewski. Slawinski was graduated from the Academy of Fine Arts. While on a tour of Italy, he first discovered the technique of Sgraffito.

During World War II, he fought in the Warsaw Uprising. After the war, he became a professor at the Fine Arts Academy, and worked to restore art objects damaged during the war. Slawinski worked in a variety of media, including fresco, hammered copper, and scratched tempera, but his specialty was sgraffito, a labor-intensive technique involving layers of cement which need to be worked on while still wet.

Slawinski visited western New York State in 1961-1963 and emigrated in 1964, settling in Buffalo, New York. His first commission was to decorate the sanctuary of the Church of the Assumption in the Black Rock section of Buffalo. This was followed by a number of projects at the motherhouse of the Sisters of St. Francis of Penance and Christian Charity at Stella Niagara. He did a mural at the Basilica of The National Shrine of Our Lady of Fatima in Lewiston New York, and additional work at the Church of St. Stanislaus in Buffalo. He did a mural of Copernicus and one of Chopin, both in sgraffito, at Villa Maria College.

The Polish Arts Club raised money to move and restore an 18 x 12 foot mural on the exterior wall of a building at Graycliff in Derby, NY to the Buffalo State College campus. The mural depicts St. Joseph Calasanctius, founder of the Piarist Priests who owned Graycliff for a number of years. In 2021 a mural done by Slawinski was donated to Canisius College by James Lawicki. The mural is now on view in the college library.
