= Buffalo Academy of the Sacred Heart =

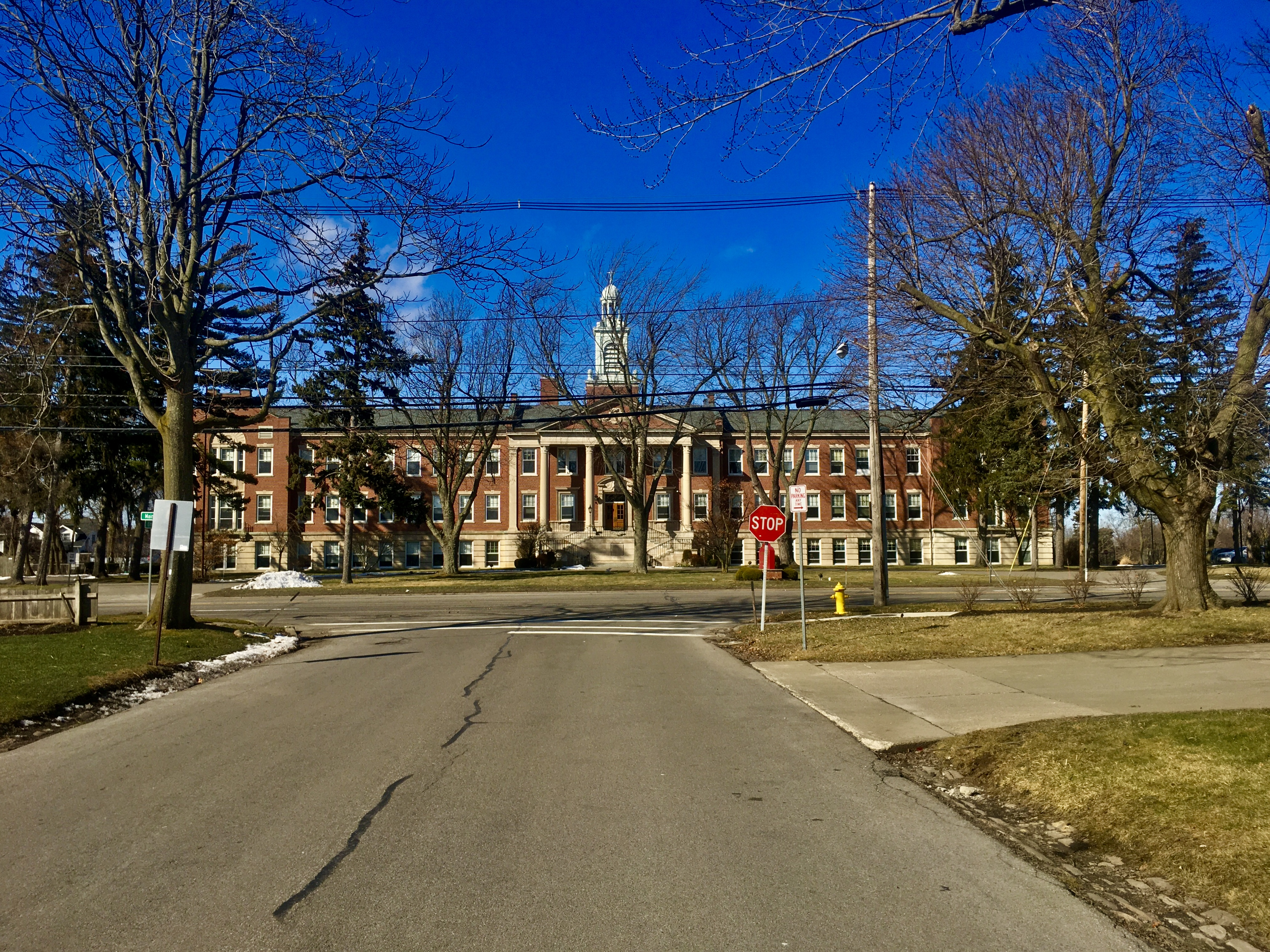
- Main Building as seen in February 2020

Location
- 3860 Main Street; Eggertsville (Town of Amherst); Eggertsville, (Erie County), New York 14226; United States; 42°57′47″N 78°48′25″W

Information
- Type: Private
- Motto: Christus Super Omnia (Christ Above All)
- Religious affiliations: Catholic (Sisters of St. Francis of Penance)
- Established: 1877
- Founder: The Sisters of St. Francis of Penance and Christian Charity
- Head of school: Jennifer Demert
- Faculty: 50
- Grades: 9-12
- Gender: Girls
- Colors: Maroon and White
- Slogan: Empowering Young Women Through Excellence in Education
- Mascot: Shamus The Shark
- Team name: Sharks
- Rival: Nardin Academy
- Accreditation: Middle States Association of Colleges and Schools
- USNWR ranking: 3rd
- Tuition: $16,650 (2024-25 school year)
- Website: www.sacredheartacademy.org

Buffalo Academy of the Sacred Heart is a Catholic Sisters of St. Francis of Penance and Christian Charity private high school for young women located in Eggertsville, New York, United States. It is operated independent of the Diocese of Buffalo.

== History ==
The Buffalo Academy of the Sacred Heart was founded by the Sisters of St. Francis of Penance and Christian Charity in 1877 to provide an education rich in the arts, sciences, and humanities for the daughters of immigrant families. The school included instruction in matters of faith and development of moral character.

The first enrollment consisted of eight young women. By 1889 the academy's campus included the convent, a five-story school building, an annex, and a building used for science labs.

The academy outgrew its quarters on Washington Street in downtown Buffalo, New York. In 1928 the Sisters secured a 5-acre (20,000 m^{2}) property in Eggertsville, and began supervising construction of the new building. On May 11, 1930, 230 students and 14 faculty members moved into the new Sacred Heart Academy.

In 1997 the campus was expanded by the purchase of an adjacent building, providing additional learning areas for SHA's music students. Clare Music Hall, named in honor of St. Clare of Assisi, opened in September 1999.

Over the summer of 2012, the academy expanded yet again. With the convent no longer in use, the school expanded to include a new state-of-the-art language and English section, which opened that fall. This area includes new technology and the school now being able to teach Mandarin Chinese, among other LOTE.

In July 2013 the academy received permission to demolish a 40-year-old garage in order to build a new gymnasium. The gym will also include a dance studio. The academy anticipates having use of the new gym by the 2014-2015 basketball season.

== Academics ==
In 2013, the Buffalo Academy of the Sacred Heart was ranked 3rd out of 131 western New York high schools in terms of academic performance. The school was also ranked #1 for its math department.

== Notable alumni and faculty ==
- Beverly Eckert '69, co-chair of the 9/11 Family Steering Committee and a leader of "Voices of September 11" after her husband Sean Rooney was killed in the September 11 attacks, was a victim of Flight 3407
- Kristen Pfaff, musician best known as the bassist for alternative rock band Hole.
- Sister Marion Beiter (1907–1982), mathematician
