= Marion Beiter =

American mathematician and educator

Sister Marion Beiter OSF
- Born: Dorothy Katharine Beiter; August 23, 1907; Buffalo, New York
- Died: October 11, 1982 (aged 75); Stella Niagara, New York
- Resting place: Sisters of St. Francis Cemetery, Stella Niagara, New York
- Education: Catholic University of America
- Scientific career
- Workplaces: Rosary Hill College (later Daemen College)
- Thesis: Coeflicients in the cyclotomic polynomial for numbers with at most three distinct odd primes in their factorization (1960)

Sister Marion Beiter OSF (August 23, 1907 – October 11, 1982), born Dorothy Katharine Beiter, was an American mathematician and educator. Her research focused on the area of cyclotomic polynomials.

Beiter was born in Buffalo to Kathryn (née Kiel) and Edward Frederick Beiter, where she attended Sacred Heart Academy. She entered the Sisters of St. Francis of Penance and Christian Charity in 1923, and professed her final vows in 1929.

She began her career in 1925 as a teacher in parochial and private schools, continuing in this capacity until 1952, when she was appointed chairwoman of the mathematics department of Rosary Hill College. She meanwhile graduated from Canisius College (1944) and St. Bonaventure University (1948), before obtaining a PhD from the Catholic University of America in 1960. In her work on cyclotomic polynomials and their coefficients she made a conjecture referred to as the Sister Beiter conjecture. Besides a sabbatical year at the State University of New York at Buffalo in 1971–1972, Beiter remained at Rosary Hill until her retirement in May 1977.

Beiter died in 1982 of a series of strokes.

== Publications ==
- Coeflicients in the cyclotomic polynomial for numbers with at most three distinct odd primes in their factorization (Thesis). Washington, D.C.: The Catholic University of America Press. 1960.
- "The Midterm Coefficient of the Cyclotomic Polynomial $F_{pqr}(x)$". The American Mathematical Monthly. 71 (7): 769–770. September 1964. doi:10.2307/2310894. JSTOR 2310894.
- "Magnitude of the Coefficients of the Cyclotomic Polynomial $F_{pqr}(x)$". The American Mathematical Monthly. 75 (4): 370–372. April 1968. doi:10.2307/2313416. JSTOR 2313416.
- "Magnitude of the Coefficients of the Cyclotomic Polynomial $F_{pqr}(x)$, II". Duke Mathematical Journal. 38 (3): 591–594. September 1971. doi:10.1215/S0012-7094-71-03873-7.
- "Coefficients of the Cyclotomic Polynomial $F_{3qr}(x)$" (PDF). The Fibonacci Quarterly. 16 (4): 302–306. August 1978.
