= Stella Niagara Education Park =

Religion
- Affiliation: Christianity (Catholic)
- District: Diocese of Buffalo
- Province: Archdiocese of New York
- Rite: Roman Rite
- Leadership: Sisters of St. Francis of Penance and Christian Charity
- Year consecrated: 1909
- Status: Active

Location
- Location: Stella Niagara, Lewiston, New York, United States
- Interactive map of Stella Niagara Education Park
- Coordinates: 43.19973°N 79.04059°W

Architecture
- Style: Gothic
- Groundbreaking: 1908
- Completed: 1908 or 1909
- Construction cost: $300,000

Website
- http://www.franciscans-stella-niagara.org/mission.htm

Stella Niagara Education Park is a coeducational Catholic elementary school, convent, and hospitality center located in the hamlet of Stella Niagara within the town of Lewiston, New York. It was founded in 1908 by members of the Sisters of St. Francis of Penance and Christian Charity.

== History ==
The Sisters of St. Francis of Penance and Christian Charity was founded in 1835 in the Netherlands. To assist the German parishes of St. Ann's and St. Michael's in Buffalo, New York, members of the order moved to the United States and opened the first convent in 1874.

When more space was needed, in 1907 some of the Sisters moved into the former March home near the Niagara River. The following year, the cornerstone was laid for a new convent, dedicated to Our Lady of the Sacred Heart. The name "Stella Niagara" was suggested by a Jesuit friend inspired by the hymn "Ave Maris Stella".

This building originally operated as co-education school and a boarding school for high school girls known as the Seminary of Our Lady of the Sacred Heart. The school operated from 1908 to 1970. In 1929 the Heidenkamp wing with a gymnasium, pool, and auditorium was built. The facilities are used by students and local groups.

The elementary school for boys, Stella Niagara Cadet Program, opened in 1935. The Stella Niagara chapel was decorated by artist Joseph Slawinski in 1964 during post-Vatican II renovations.

In 1971, Stella Niagara Education Park opened after obtaining a charter from the New York State Board of Regents. In September 1979, over 200 Love Canal residents were relocated to SNEP during environmental remediation work.

The Post Office for the hamlet of Stella Niagara, New York is located on campus.

In June 2015, the Western New York Land Conservancy purchased twenty-nine acres with a quarter-mile of shoreline from the sisters to form the Stella Niagara Preserve, the largest privately owned, undeveloped tract of land along the Niagara River. It is listed on the Greater Niagara Birding Trail.

== School ==
The Stella Niagara Education Park school starts at the Montessori preschool level for children three to five years of age. Instruction extends through the eighth grade. As of 2022, the school's enrollment is approximately 170 students. It has a student/teacher ratio of 8:1. The school's curriculum includes core subjects as well as computer literacy, foreign languages, and art. SNEP is affiliated with the Western New York Library Resources Council through the Orleans-Niagara BOCES School Library System. it is accredited by the Middle States Association.

The school requires children to take regular physical education and encourages students to participate in school athletics. The school has mandatory religion classes. Mass is held at the school on religious holidays.

== Hospitality center ==
Stella Niagara Education Park hosts a hospitality facility named the Center of Renewal. The Center of Renewal offers religious and spiritual counseling, group retreats, and workshops.

== See also ==
- St. Francis of Assisi
- Third Order of St. Francis
