= Maria Catharina Daemen =

Mother Magdalena, Dutch nun (1787-1858)

Mother Magdalena
- Born: Maria Catharina Daemen; 19 November 1787; Ohé en Laak
- Died: 7 August 1858 (aged 70); Heythuysen
- Occupation: Nun
- Known for: Founder of the Sisters of St. Francis of Penance and Christian Charity

Maria Catharina Daemen (19 November 1787 – 7 August 1858), known in religion as Mother Magdalena, was a Dutch nun and the founder of the Sisters of St. Francis of Penance and Christian Charity in Heythuysen, Netherlands.

== Early life ==
Daemen was born in Ohé en Laak on 19 November 1787. Her surname is spelled as Damen in some sources, and her forename appears variously as Catherine and Katharina, her religious name also as Magdalen.

As a young person, she was introduced to the Franciscan religion when the Franciscan Capuchins returned from exile to Maaseik.

== Religion ==
In 1817, Daemen became a nun under the Third Order Secular of St. Francis and took the religious name Mother Magdalena. She referred to that day as the greatest in her life. As a nun, Mother Magdalena taught courses on topics like needlework and religion.

In 1835, she became the founder of the Sisters of St. Francis of Penance and Christian Charity in Heythuysen, where she worked with the children in need.

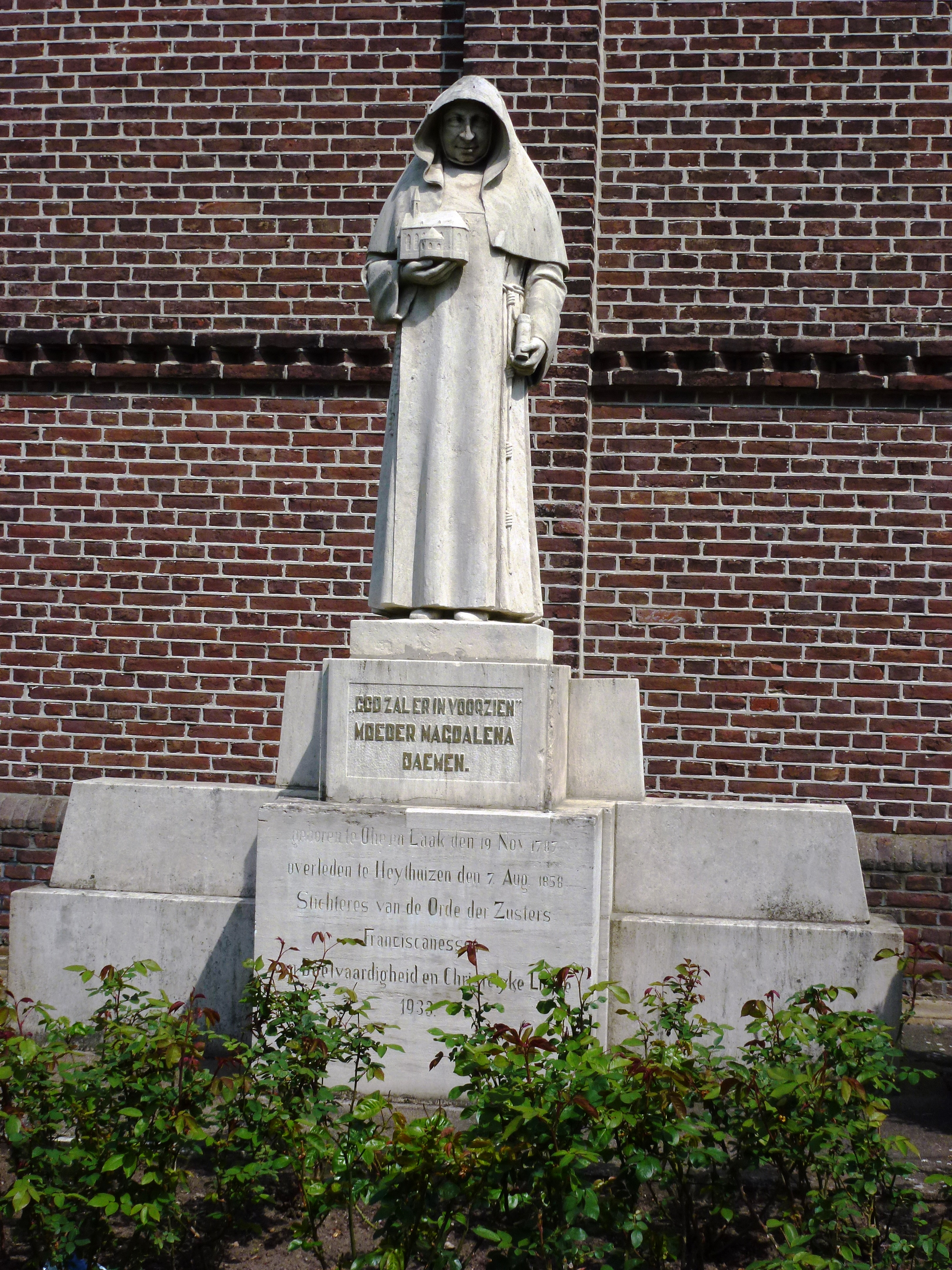
Memorial to Magdalena Daemen

== Legacy ==
Daemen died in Heythuysen on 7 August 1858.

Daemen University in New York state, United States, is named for her. The university was founded by the Sisters of St. Francis in 1947 as Rosary Hill College but was renamed to Daemen College in 1976 and later gained university status.
