= 9/11: Press for Truth =

- Film poster
- Directed by: Ray Nowosielski
- Written by: Ray Nowosielski; Paul Thompson; Kyle Hence
- Produced by: John Duffy; Ray Nowosielski
- Starring: Patty Casazza; Lorie Van Auken; Mindy Kleinberg; Paul Thompson
- Narrated by: Michael Pritchard
- Distributed by: Ryko Distribution
- Release date: September 10, 2006
- Running time: 85 minutes
- Country: United States
- Language: English

9/11: Press for Truth (also known as Press for Truth) is a 2006 documentary film about the September 11 attacks on the United States. Directed by the American filmmaker Ray Nowosielski, it was partially based on The Terror Timeline, by Paul Thompson.

== Development and release ==
Filmmakers Ray Nowosielski and John Duffy first became interested in making a film about the September 11 attacks when they found Paul Thompson's Complete 911 Timeline website in spring 2003. After obtaining funding, they met Thompson in September 2004, who agreed to let them adapt his work.

The filmmakers also met Kyle Hence, who had co-founded 9/11 Citizens Watch, an advocacy organization which monitored the activities of the 9/11 Commission on behalf of the public and was in close contact with the 9/11 Family Steering Committee. He agreed to join the production as executive producer (eventually also becoming a co-producer and co-writer), and in the spring of 2005, helped them get interviews with three of the "Jersey Girls" (widows of individuals killed in the attacks).

Production ended in December 2005, with post-production completed in July 2006.

The film premiered theatrically in September 2006 in New York City and the San Francisco Bay area. It received a simultaneous limited DVD release in over fifty cities across America as well as Canada, Great Britain, the Czech Republic, Australia, and Japan.

== Summary ==
9/11: Press for Truth follows three of the Jersey Girls, as well as some other family members in their search for answers about the September 11 attacks. Among their questions were:

- "Why had the U.S. military defenses failed to stop any of the four hijacked planes?"
- "Why was there a lack of immediate response by the president and his secret service detail?"
- "Why did the buildings fall?"
- "How did U.S. intelligence miss the escape of terrorists from Afghanistan to Pakistan during time of war?"
- "Why did the U.S. consider Pakistan an ally in the fight against terrorism when Pakistan's own intelligence service, ISI, apparently was funding terrorism?"

The film uses archive news footage, interviews, press conferences and newspaper clippings to document the attacks and the establishment and workings of the 9/11 Commission. The film can be roughly divided into three sections:

The first part of the film describes the efforts to pressure the U.S. government into setting up a formal investigation and shows how eventually the decision was made to create the 9/11 Commission. The family members in turn, set up a group called the 9/11 Family Steering Committee, to monitor the Commission and provide it with additional questions. The film shows some of the initial stumbles of the Commission, such as the resignation of Henry Kissinger, the original chairman of the Commission, after receiving criticism for refusing to release the names of all his firm's clients. It denounces some of the decisions of the Bush Administration, such as only allowing certain members of the Commission to review sensitive White House documents, and president George W. Bush and vice president Dick Cheney agreeing to meet with the Commission, but only together, behind closed doors and not under oath. The segment ends with the Jersey Girls complaining that the eventual report of the 9/11 Commission failed to meet their expectations.

The second part begins by expounding the Jersey Girls' complaints of what they perceive as unsatisfactory coverage by the U.S. news media. It introduces Paul Thompson, who discusses what he claims is evidence showing the U.S. government was aware of the threat of planes being flown into buildings, and that it ignored numerous warnings from foreign countries. He then describes the August 6, 2001 President's Daily Brief (entitled "Bin Ladin Determined To Strike in US") that gave a general warning about a possible attack.

The final part of the film looks at the U.S. invasion of Afghanistan, detailing how Osama bin Laden, along with top members of Al-Qaeda and the Taliban, was able to repeatedly escape while being chased by U.S. forces, eventually fleeing to Pakistan. It also elaborates briefly on the Soviet–Afghan War and how the Afghan Muhajadeen, some elements of which later played a role in Al-Qaeda, were funded by the U.S. to fight the Soviets. This is followed by a look at Indian claims that Pakistani intelligence service ISI was involved in funding the 9/11 hijackers, and blames the 9/11 Commission for a lack of attention to this investigational avenue. The film concludes with a final reflection on what it sees as shortcomings in the U.S. news media.

== Reception ==
The film was reviewed by New Zealand news site Scoop.co.nz, The New American, The Stanford Daily, Santa Maria Sun, The Hartford Courant, Slant Magazine, The Indianapolis Star, NUVO, The Albuquerque Tribune, Polish magazine Przekrój, and Glenn Erickson from DVD Talk.

Nowosielski and Duffy later produced the documentary Who is Rich Blee, deducing the identities of several CIA agents inside the Bin Laden Issue Station in the years immediately before 2001. Before publication, the CIA allegedly "threatened" them under the Intelligence Identities Protection Act. Their documentary was posted with the names redacted. But they claim their webmaster accidentally posted some emails that contained the identities.

== See also ==
- September 11 attacks in popular culture
