= Colgan Air Flight 3407 =

2009 aviation accident in New York

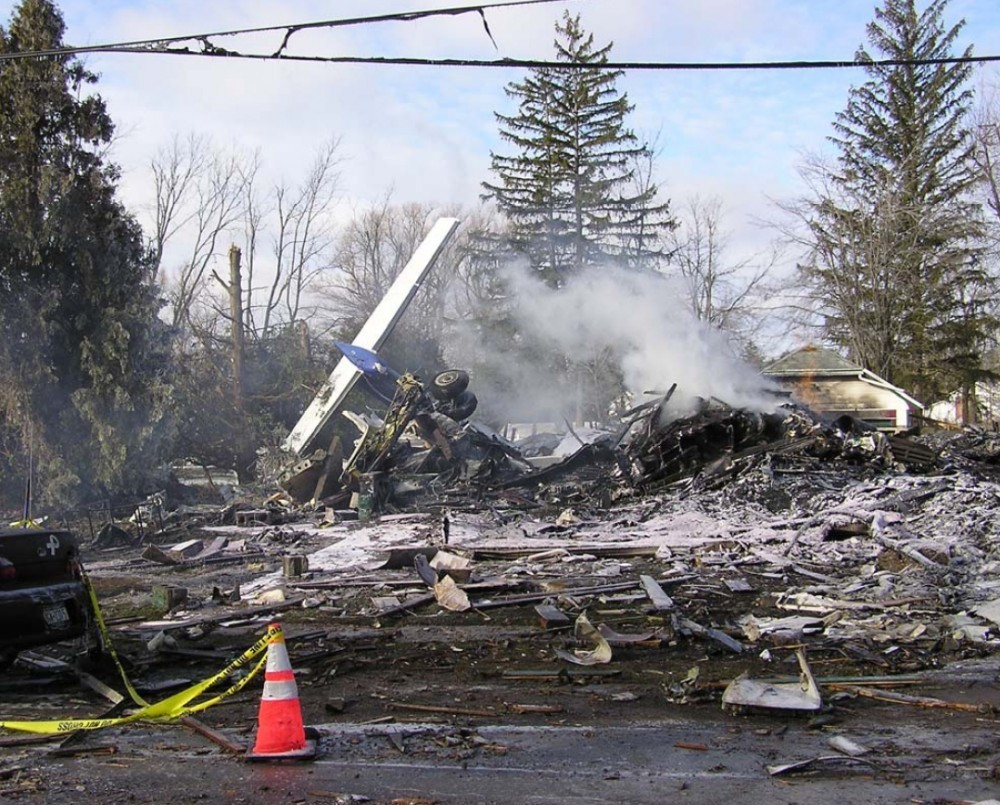
- Scattered aircraft wreckage

Accident
- Date: February 12, 2009
- Summary: Stalled and crashed into house during landing approach due to pilot error
- Site: Clarence Center, New York, U.S.; 43.0116°N 78.6391°W
- Total fatalities: 50
- Total injuries: 4

Aircraft
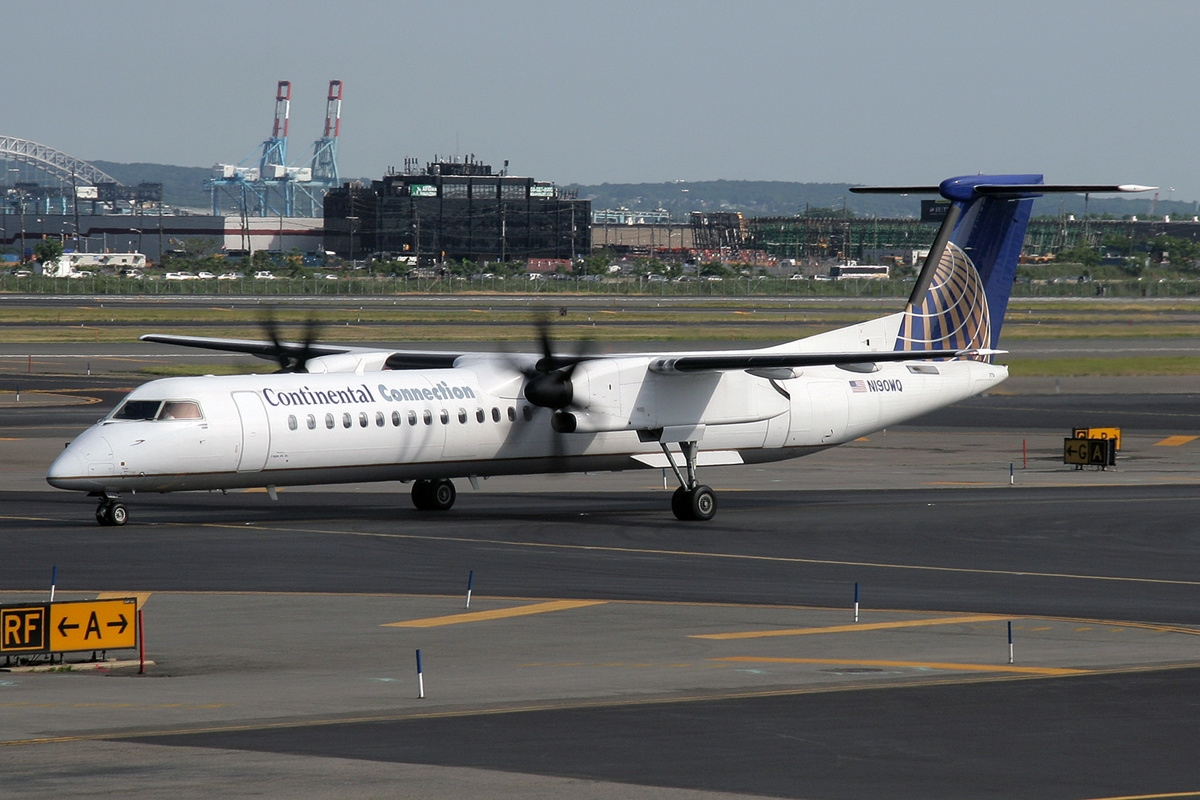
- A Bombardier Q400 of Colgan Air, similar to the aircraft involved
- Aircraft type: Bombardier Q400
- Operator: Colgan Air on behalf of Continental Connection
- IATA flight No.: 9L3407
- ICAO flight No.: CJC3407
- Call sign: COLGAN 3407
- Registration: N200WQ
- Flight origin: Newark Liberty International Airport, Newark, New Jersey, United States
- Destination: Buffalo Niagara International Airport, Buffalo, New York, United States
- Occupants: 49
- Passengers: 45
- Crew: 4
- Fatalities: 49
- Survivors: 0

Ground casualties
- Ground fatalities: 1
- Ground injuries: 4

Colgan Air Flight 3407 was a scheduled passenger flight from Newark, New Jersey, to Buffalo, New York, United States, on February 12, 2009. Approaching Buffalo, the Bombardier Q400 entered an aerodynamic stall from which it did not recover and crashed into a house at 6038 Long Street in Clarence Center, New York, at 10:17 pm EST (03:17 UTC), about 5 miles (8 km; 4 nmi) from the end of the runway, killing all 49 passengers and crew on board and one person inside the house.

The National Transportation Safety Board conducted the accident investigation and published a final report on February 2, 2010, that identified the probable cause as the pilots' inappropriate response to stall warnings.

Colgan Air staffed and maintained the aircraft used on the flight that was scheduled, marketed, and sold by Continental Airlines under its Continental Connection brand. Families of the accident victims lobbied the U.S. Congress to enact more stringent regulations for regional carriers and to improve the scrutiny of safe operating procedures and the working conditions of pilots. The Airline Safety and Federal Aviation Administration Extension Act of 2010 (Public Law 111–216) required some of these regulation changes.

At the time, it was the deadliest aviation accident involving a Bombardier Q400 and remained so until the crash of US-Bangla Airlines Flight 211 nine years later.

== Aircraft and crew ==
=== Aircraft ===
The aircraft involved was a Bombardier Q400, MSN 4200, registered as N200WQ, that was manufactured by Bombardier Aviation in April 2008. In its 10 months of service, the aircraft accumulated 1819 airframe hours and 1809 takeoff and landing cycles. It was equipped with two Pratt & Whitney Canada PW150A engines.

=== Crew ===
Captain Marvin Renslow, 47, of Lutz, Florida, was the pilot in command, and Rebecca Lynne Shaw, 24, of Maple Valley, Washington, served as the first officer. The cabin crew consisted of two flight attendants. Renslow was hired in September 2005 and had accumulated 3,379 total flight hours, with 111 hours as a captain on the Q400. Shaw was hired in January 2008 and had 2,244 hours, 774 of which were in turbine aircraft, including the Q400.

== Flight details ==
Newark Liberty International Airport (EWR), Buffalo Niagara International Airport (BUF) and Clarence Center, the location of the crash site

Colgan Air Flight 3407 (9L/CJC 3407) was marketed as Continental Connection Flight 3407. It was delayed for two hours and the aircraft departed at 21:18 EST (02:18 UTC), from Newark Liberty International Airport to Buffalo Niagara International Airport.

This was the only fatal accident for a Colgan Air passenger flight in the company's history. One previous repositioning flight, with no passengers, crashed offshore of Cape Cod, Massachusetts, in August 2003, killing both of the pilots. The only prior accident involving a Colgan Air passenger flight occurred at LaGuardia Airport, when another plane collided with the Colgan aircraft while taxiing, resulting in minor injuries to a flight attendant.

Two Canadian passengers, one Chinese passenger and one Israeli passenger were on board. The remaining 41 passengers, as well as all crew members, were American.

== Accident ==
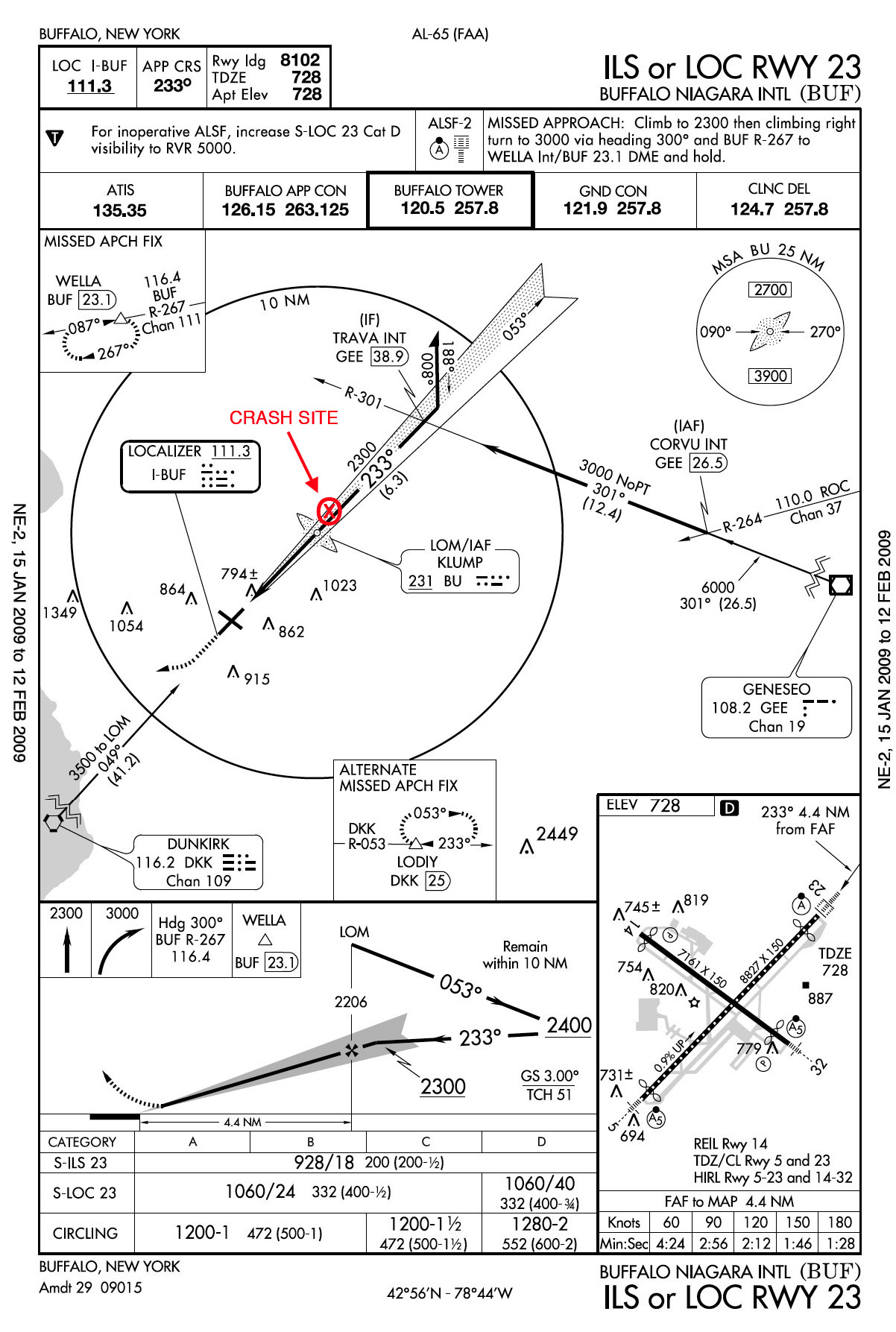
FAA ILS/LOC approach plate to runway 23 at Buffalo Niagara International Airport (KBUF). The flight crashed (marked in red) near the locator outer marker (LOM) (identifier: "KLUMP") about five nautical miles from the threshold of Rwy 23.

Shortly after the flight was cleared for an instrument landing system approach to Runway 23 at Buffalo Niagara International Airport, it disappeared from radar. The weather consisted of light snow and fog with wind of 15 knots (28 km/h; 17 mph). The deicing system had been activated 11 minutes after takeoff. Shortly before the crash, the pilots discussed significant ice accretion on the aircraft's wings and windshield. Two other aircraft reported icing conditions around the time of the crash.

The last radio transmission from the flight occurred when the first officer acknowledged a routine instruction to change to tower radio frequency while 3.0 mi (4.8 km) northeast of the radio beacon KLUMP (see diagram). The crash occurred 41 seconds after that last transmission. As ATC approach control was unable to receive any further response from the flight, the assistance of Delta Air Lines Flight 1998 (N942DL; MD-88 flying from ATL) and US Airways Flight 1452 ( N951UW; E190 flying from DCA) was requested, but neither was able to spot the missing plane.

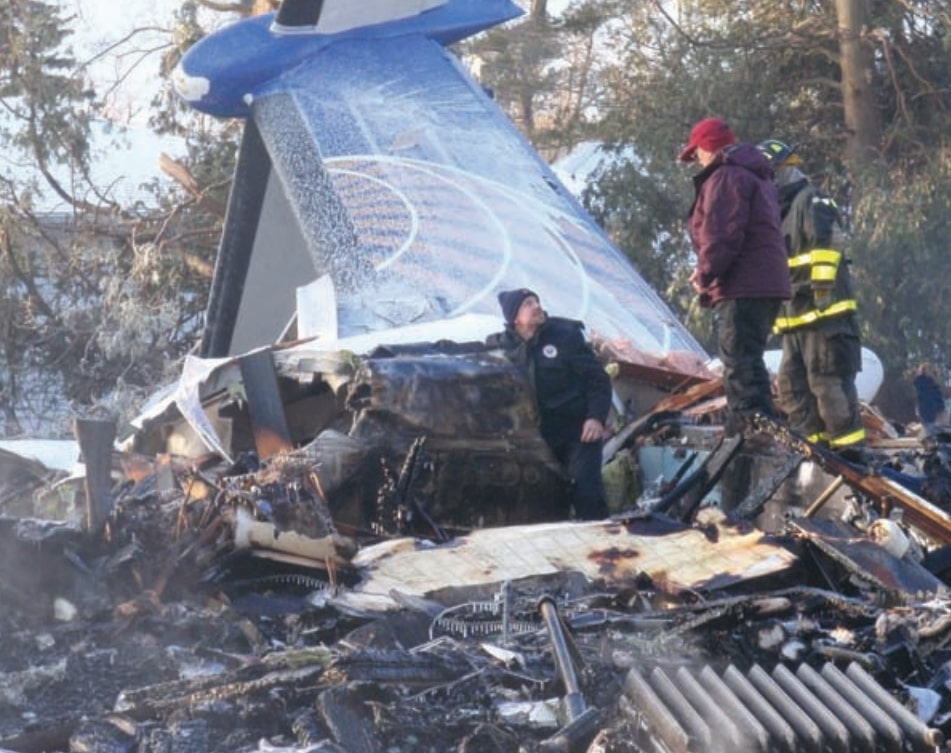
The wreckage

Following the clearance for final approach, landing gear and flaps (5°) were extended. The flight data recorder indicated that the airspeed had slowed to 145 knots (269 km/h; 167 mph). The captain then called for the flaps to be increased to 15°. The airspeed continued to slow to 135 knots (250 km/h; 155 mph). Six seconds later, the aircraft's stick shaker activated, warning of an impending stall, as the speed continued to slow to 131 knots (243 km/h; 151 mph). The captain responded by abruptly pulling back on the control column, followed by increasing thrust to 75% power, instead of lowering the nose and applying full power, which was the proper stall-recovery technique. That improper action pitched the nose up even further, increasing the gravitational load and increasing the stall speed. The stick pusher, which applies a nose-down control-column input to decrease the wing's angle of attack after a stall, activated, but the captain overrode the stick pusher and continued pulling back on the control column. The first officer retracted the flaps without consulting the captain, making recovery even more difficult.

In its final moments, the aircraft pitched up 31°, then pitched down 25°, then rolled left 46° and snapped back to the right at 105°. Occupants aboard experienced g-forces estimated at nearly 2 g. The crew issued no emergency declaration as they rapidly lost altitude and crashed into a private home at 6038 Long Street, about 5 mi (8.0 km) from the end of the runway, with the nose pointed away from the airport. The aircraft burst into flames as the fuel tanks ruptured on impact, destroying the house of Douglas and Karen Wielinski, and most of the plane. Douglas was killed; his wife Karen and their daughter Jill managed to escape with minor injuries. Very little damage occurred to surrounding homes even though the lots in that area are only 60 ft (18.3 m) wide. As the home was within one block of the Clarence Center firehouse, emergency personnel were able to respond quickly. Two firefighters were injured and 12 nearby houses were evacuated.

== Victims ==
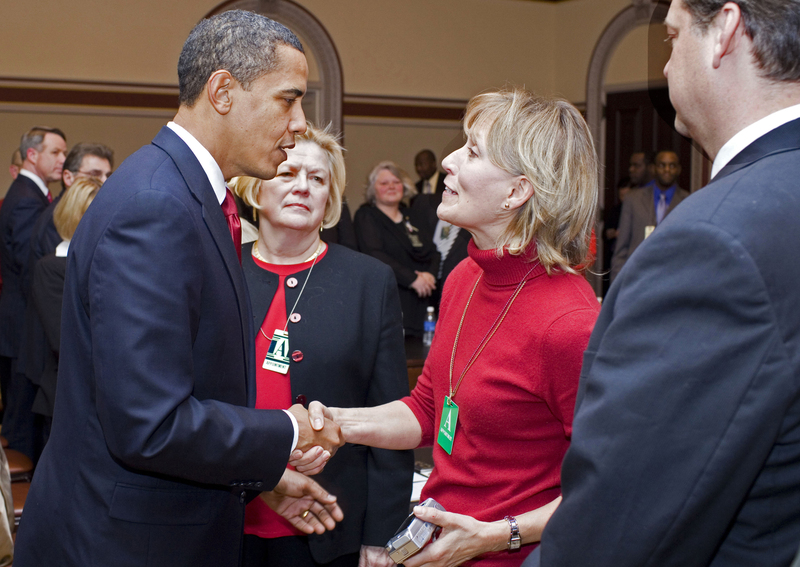
U.S. president Barack Obama shaking hands with Beverly Eckert six days before the accident

A total of 50 people were killed: 49 passengers and crew and a resident of the house that was struck. Four injuries occurred on the ground, including two other people inside the home at the time of the crash. Among the dead were:

- Alison Des Forges, a human-rights investigator and an expert on the Rwandan genocide.
- Beverly Eckert, who had become co-chairman of the 9/11 Family Steering Committee and a leader of Voices of September 11 after her husband Sean Rooney was killed in the September 11 attacks. Eckert was traveling to Buffalo to celebrate her husband's 58th birthday and award a scholarship in his memory at Canisius High School.
- Gerry Niewood and Coleman Mellett, jazz musicians who were traveling to a concert to play alongside Chuck Mangione and the Buffalo Philharmonic Orchestra.
- Susan Wehle, the first American female Jewish Renewal cantor.

== Reactions ==
- Colgan Air provided a telephone number for families and friends on February 13, and a family-assistance center was opened at the Cheektowaga Senior Center in Cheektowaga, New York. The American Red Cross also opened reception centers in Buffalo and Newark where family members could receive support from mental-health and spiritual-care workers.
- During the afternoon, the United States House of Representatives held a moment of silence for the victims and their families.
- Buffalo's professional ice hockey team, the Buffalo Sabres, held a moment of silence prior to their scheduled game the next night against the San Jose Sharks.
- The University at Buffalo, which in the crash lost 11 passengers who were former employees, faculty, or alumni and 12 who were their family members, held a remembrance service on February 17, 2009. A band with the flight number was worn on the school's players' uniforms for the remainder of the basketball season.
- Buffalo State College's 11th president, Muriel Howard, released a statement regarding the six alumni killed on Flight 3407. Beverly Eckert was a 1975 graduate from Buffalo State.
- On March 4, 2009, New York governor David Paterson proposed the creation of a scholarship fund to benefit children and financial dependents of the 50 crash victims. The Flight 3407 Memorial Scholarship would cover costs for up to four years of undergraduate study at a SUNY or CUNY school, or a private college or university in New York.
- A memorial was created at the site of the crash, dedicated to lives lost in this disaster. It includes a landscaped garden.
- The accident was the basis for a PBS Frontline episode on the regional airline industry. Discussed in the episode were issues relating to regional airline regulation, training requirements, safety and working conditions, as well as the operating principles of regional airlines and the agreements between regional carriers and major airlines.

== Investigation ==
A three-dimensional animated reconstruction showing the last two minutes of the flight

The U.S. National Transportation Safety Board (NTSB) began its inquiry on February 13 with a team of 14 investigators. Both the flight data recorder (FDR) and the cockpit voice recorder (CVR) were recovered, and they were transported to Washington, D.C. for analysis.

=== Stick shaker ===
Data extracted from the FDR revealed that the aircraft experienced severe pitch-and-roll oscillations shortly after the extension of flaps and landing gear, which was followed by the activation of the stick shaker stall-warning system. The aircraft fell 800 feet (240 m) and then crashed on a northeast heading opposite of the approach heading to the airport. Occupants experienced estimated accelerations of up to 2 g prior to impact.

Freezing temperatures made access to crash debris difficult. Portable heaters were used to melt ice left in the wake of the firefighting efforts. Human remains were carefully removed and then finally identified over a period of several weeks with the assistance of forensic anthropology students. The cockpit had sustained the greatest impact force, while the main cabin was mostly destroyed by the ensuing fire. Passengers in the rear section were still strapped in their seats.

=== Autopilot ===
The autopilot was under control until it automatically disconnected when the stall-warning stick shaker activated. The NTSB found no evidence of severe icing conditions that would have required the pilots to fly manually. Colgan recommended that its pilots fly manually in icing conditions and required them to do so in severe icing conditions. In December 2008, the NTSB issued a safety bulletin about the danger of keeping the autopilot engaged during icing conditions. Flying the plane manually was essential to ensure that pilots would be able to detect changes in the handling characteristics of the airplane, which are warning signs of ice accumulation.

It was later determined that the stick shaker trigger had been set improperly, so when the stick shaker engaged, the aircraft was not actually in or near a stall condition. However, when the captain reacted inappropriately to the stick shaker by pulling the nose up, the aircraft entered an actual stall and the stick pusher activated. As designed, it pushed the nose down to recover from the stall, but the captain again reacted improperly and overrode the pusher by pulling back again on the control column, causing the plane to lose even more airspeed and control. Bill Voss, president of the Flight Safety Foundation, told USA Today that it sounded as though the plane was in "a deep stall situation."

=== Pilot training ===
On May 11, 2009, information about Renslow's training record was released. According to an article in The Wall Street Journal, before joining Colgan, he had failed three "check rides", including some at Gulfstream International's training program, and "people close to the investigation" suggested that he might not have been adequately trained to respond to the emergency. Investigators examined possible crew fatigue, as the captain appeared to have been at the Newark airport overnight prior to the day of the 21:18 departure of the accident flight. The first officer commuted from Seattle to Newark on an overnight flight. These findings during the investigation led the FAA to issue a "Call to Action" for improvements in the practices of regional carriers.

=== Inattention ===
In response to questioning from the NTSB, Colgan Air officials acknowledged that both pilots had not been paying close attention to the aircraft's instruments and did not properly follow the airline's procedures for handling an impending stall. John Barrett, Colgan's director of flight standards, said: "I believe Capt. Renslow did have intentions of landing safely at Buffalo, as well as first officer Shaw, but obviously in those last few moments ... the flight instruments were not being monitored, and that's an indication of a lack of situational awareness."

The official transcript of the crew's communication obtained from the CVR, as well as an animated depiction of the crash, constructed using data from the FDR, were made available to the public on May 12, 2009. Some of the crew's communication violated federal rules banning nonessential conversation.

=== Predicted problems ===
On June 3, 2009, The New York Times published an article detailing complaints about Colgan's operations from an FAA inspector who observed test flights in January 2008. As with a previous FAA incident handling other inspectors' complaints, the Colgan inspector's complaints were deferred and the inspector was demoted. The incident was under investigation by the Office of Special Counsel (OSC), the agency responsible for federal government whistleblower complaints. On August 5, 2009, the OSC released a report stating that the inspector's removal from the Colgan inspection team was proper.

=== Final report ===
On February 2, 2010, the NTSB issued its final report, describing the details of its investigation that led to 46 specific conclusions.

Those conclusions included the fact that both the captain and the first officer were fatigued at the time of the accident, but the NTSB could not determine how much it degraded their performance.

The pilots' performance was likely impaired because of fatigue, but the extent of their impairment and the degree to which it contributed to the performance deficiencies that occurred during the flight cannot be conclusively determined.

Another conclusion was the fact that both the captain and the first officer responded to the stall warning in a manner contrary to their training. The NTSB could not explain why the first officer retracted the flaps and suggested that the landing gear should also be retracted, although it did find that the current approach to stall training was inadequate:

The current air carrier approach-to-stall training did not fully prepare the flight crew for an unexpected stall in the Q400 and did not address the actions that are needed to recover from a fully developed stall.

Those findings were immediately followed by the board's probable-cause statement:

The captain's inappropriate response to the activation of the stick shaker, which led to an aerodynamic stall from which the airplane did not recover. Contributing to the accident were (1) the flight crew's failure to monitor airspeed in relation to the rising position of the low-speed cue, (2) the flight crew's failure to adhere to sterile cockpit procedures, (3) the captain's failure to effectively manage the flight, and (4) Colgan Air's inadequate procedures for airspeed selection and management during approaches in icing conditions.

NTSB chairman Deborah Hersman, while concurring, indicated that she considered fatigue to be a contributing factor. She compared the 20 years that fatigue had remained on the NTSB's Most Wanted List of transportation safety improvements, during which no meaningful action was taken by regulators in response, to the changes in tolerance for alcohol over the same period, noting that the impact on performance from fatigue and alcohol were similar.

However, NTSB vice chairman Christopher A. Hart and board member Robert L. Sumwalt III did not agree with Hersman regarding the inclusion of fatigue as a contributing factor, believing that evidence was insufficient to support such a conclusion. The same type of pilot errors and violations of standard operating procedure had been found in other accidents in which fatigue was not a factor.

To state that fatigue was a contributing factor, and thus part of the probable cause, would be inconsistent with the above finding and would, therefore, disrupt this flow of logic. I did not feel, therefore – nor did the board's majority – that we had sufficient information or evidence to conclude that fatigue should be part of the probable cause of this accident.

== Legacy ==
The FAA proposed or implemented several rule changes as a result of the Flight 3407 accident, including:

- Revised pilot fatigue rules
- A rule change requiring all airline pilots (both captain and first officer) to hold Airline Transport Pilot (ATP) certificates, which effectively increased the minimum experience for first officers from 250 hours to in most cases 1,500 hours of flight experience. (Captain Renslow had an ATP, Shaw had a Commercial certificate. Both pilots had more than 1,500 hours total time.)
- A change in the way examiners grade checkrides in flight simulators during stalls.
- Investigators also scrutinized the Practical Test Standards for ATP certification, which allowed for an altitude loss of no more than 100 ft (30 m) in a simulated stall. The NTSB theorized that due to this low tolerance in a tested simulation environment, pilots may have come to fear loss of altitude in a stall, and thus focused primarily on preventing such a loss, even to the detriment of recovering from the stall itself. New standards subsequently issued by the FAA eliminate any specific altitude loss stipulation, calling instead for "minimal loss of elevation" in a stall. One examiner told an aviation magazine that he is not allowed to fail any applicant for losing altitude in a simulated stall, so long as the pilot is able to regain the original altitude.
- The NTSB issued safety recommendations to the FAA to strengthen the way airlines check into the background of pilot applicants, including requiring previous employers to disclose training records and records of any previous failures. Congress took note of these recommendations and included them in an August 2010 amendment to the Pilot Record Improvement Act (PRIA) requiring the FAA to record training failures in a national Pilot Records Database (PRD) which would aid airlines in identifying pilot applicants like Captain Renslow, who had multiple training failures at different airlines during his career.

The law stipulated that "before allowing an individual to begin service as a pilot, an air carrier shall access and evaluate ... information pertaining to the individual from the pilot records database." Items required to be entered into the PRD, and considered by hiring airlines, included "training, qualifications, proficiency, or professional competence of the individual, including comments and evaluations made by a check airman ... any disciplinary action taken with respect to the individual that was not subsequently overturned; and any release from employment or resignation, termination, or disqualification with respect to employment."

— NTSB Blog: Twelve Years After Colgan 3407, FAA Still Hasn't Implemented Pilot Records Database (February 12, 2021)

Congress appropriated $24 million to help facilitate creation of the PRD. But 11 years later, despite lobbying by a group of relatives of crash victims, as well as Atlas Air Flight 3591 – another aviation accident in which a pilot concealed his training records – the FAA had still not completed the PRD as directed by the NTSB. It was not until May 2021 that the FAA introduced the PRD. The FAA's page about the PRD says:

The final rule for the Pilot Records Database requires air carriers and certain other operators to report pilots' employment history, training, and qualifications to the database. The rule also requires air carriers and certain operators to review records contained in the database when considering pilots for employment.

— FAA Completes Rule Establishing Pilot Records Database to Increase Safety (May 26, 2021)

In February 2019, to mark the 10th anniversary of the crash, ceremonies were held in Buffalo and the surrounding area in remembrance of the victims.

== In popular culture ==
- The Cineflix/National Geographic series Mayday featured the incident in the fourth episode of season 10, titled "Dead Tired". The dramatization was broadcast with the title "Stalled in the Sky" in the United Kingdom. The flight was also included in a Mayday: The Accident Files Season 2 special titled "Rookie Errors".
- A breakdown of Flight 3407 is featured in the Season 1 episode "Human Error" for the NBC News TV series Why Planes Crash.

== See also ==
- Icing conditions in aviation
- United Express Flight 6291 — a similar accident caused by an aerodynamic stall
- 2025 Potomac River mid-air collision — a 2025 mid-air collision and the first major fatal commercial crash in the United States following this accident
