= Buffalo State University =

Public university in Buffalo, New York, US

Coordinates: 42.9347°N 78.8839°W

State University of New York Buffalo State University
- Former name: List: Buffalo Normal School (1871–1888); State Normal and Training School (1888–1927); State Teachers College at Buffalo (1928–1946); New York State College for Teachers at Buffalo (1946–1950); SUNY, New York State College for Teachers (1950–1951); State University College for Teachers at Buffalo (1951–1959); State University College of Education at Buffalo (1960–1961); State University College at Buffalo (1961–2023)
- Motto: Dedicated to Excellence
- Type: Public university
- Established: September 13, 1871; 155 years ago
- Parent institution: State University of New York
- Academic affiliations: CUMU
- Chancellor: John B. King Jr.
- President: Jennifer L. Burris
- Provost: Amitra Wall
- Students: 6,095 (fall 2025)
- Undergraduates: 5,196 (fall 2025)
- Postgraduates: 899 (fall 2025)
- Location: Buffalo, New York, U.S.
- Campus: 125 acres (51 ha); Urban
- Colors: Burnt orange, purple, warm gray, and cool gray
- Nickname: Bengals
- Sporting affiliations: NCAA Division III, SUNYAC, Liberty League
- Mascot: Benji the Bengal
- Website: buffalostate.edu

The State University of New York Buffalo State University (also referred to as SUNY Buffalo State University or Buffalo State University) is a public university in Buffalo, New York, United States. It is part of the State University of New York (SUNY) system.

The institution was originally founded in 1871 as the Buffalo Normal School to train teachers. It offers 79 undergraduate majors with 11 honors options, 11 post baccalaureate teacher certification programs, and 64 graduate programs. It was formerly known as the State University College at Buffalo (then branded as the Buffalo State College) before the 2023 status change.

== History ==
Buffalo State was founded in 1871 as the Buffalo Normal School before becoming the State Normal and Training School (1888–1927), the State Teachers College at Buffalo (1928–1946), the New York State College for Teachers at Buffalo (1946–1950), SUNY, New York State College for Teachers (1950–1951), the State University College for Teachers at Buffalo (1951–1959), the State University College of Education at Buffalo (1960–1961), State University College at Buffalo (1961), and SUNY Buffalo State University in 2023.

Eighty-six students attended the Buffalo Normal School on the first day of classes on September 13, 1871. The school's purpose was to provide a uniform training program for teachers to serve Buffalo's fast-growing public school population. Curricular offerings now include more than 250 undergraduate and graduate programs.

The WWII years were another time of growth for the college; in 1944, the now renowned Special Education program was founded and in 1948, the first dormitory building was erected where the present-day Moot Hall is located. In 1961, Buffalo State was the first institution in the SUNY system to offer a study-abroad program, a semester-long immersion program in Siena, Italy. International study programs now include international exchange and study-abroad programs in Australia, Canada, England, Italy, the Netherlands, Puerto Rico, and Spain.

In 1964, the Buffalo State University Planetarium opened its doors with a 24-foot dome. On November 17, 1978, a fire destroyed the facility but the community's generosity allowed it to reopen on April 18, 1980. In April 1982, it was renamed the Whitworth Ferguson Planetarium in honor of its greatest benefactor. In January 2013, the planetarium hosted a closing ceremony that highlighted its 48-year history. In 2015, a donation allowed the planetarium to reopen with a temporary 20-foot inflatable fulldome system. The new 35-foot dome facility is now open in the Science And Mathematics Complex.

== Campus ==
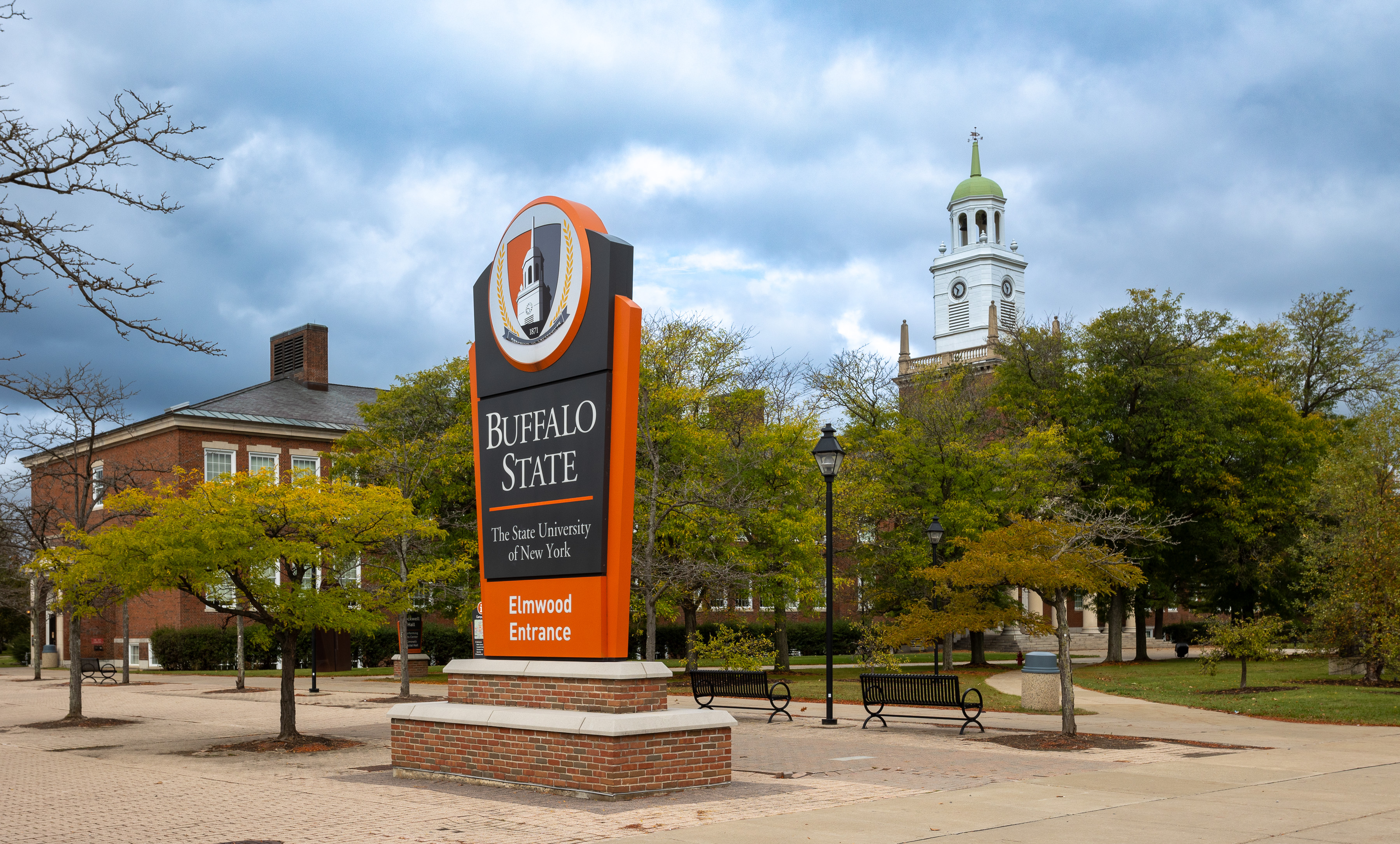
Elmwood entrance

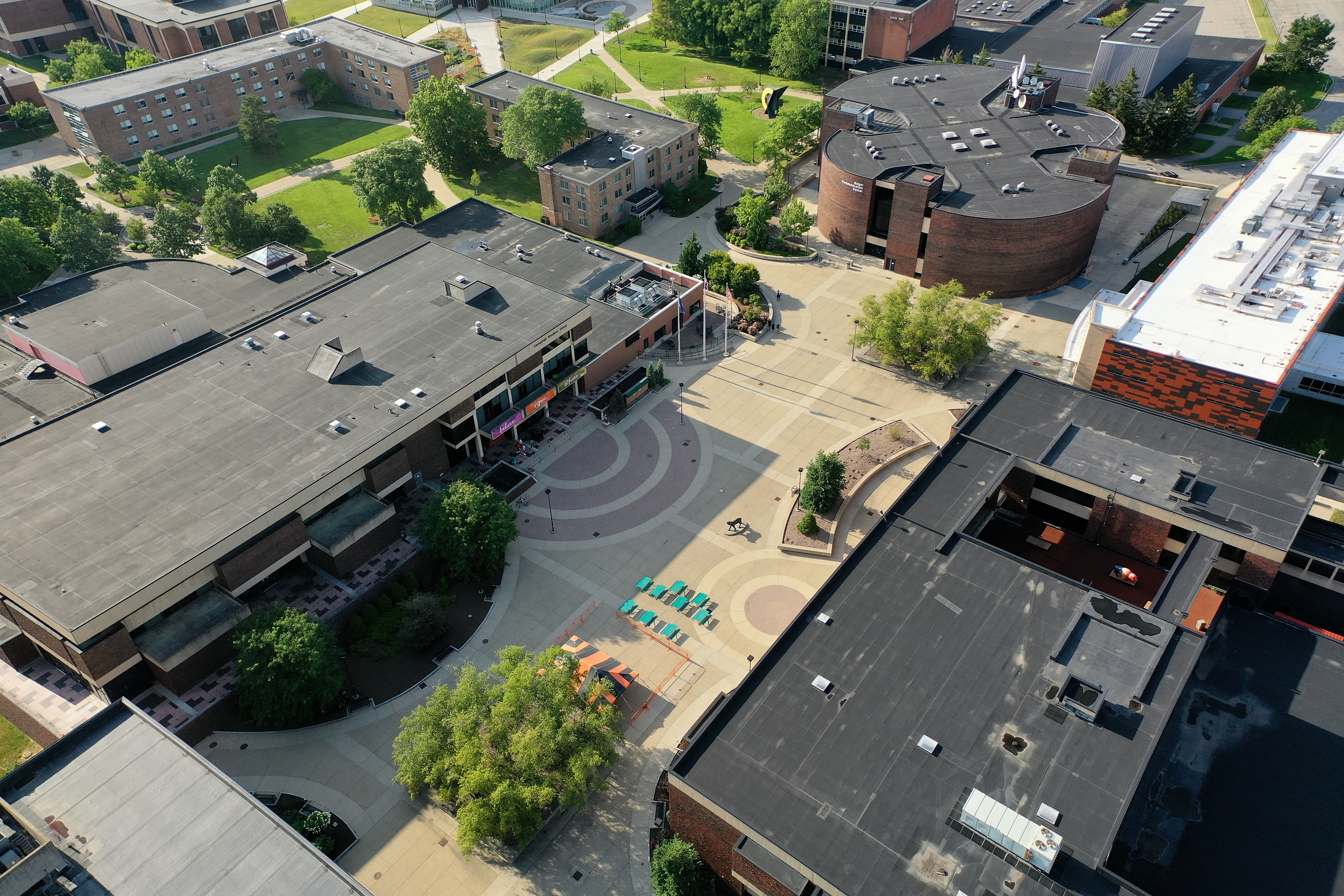
Bengal Walk and main quad

Buffalo State has 29 buildings including student centers, academic buildings, athletics buildings, office buildings, and residence halls. Buffalo State is undergoing a $350 million campus-wide improvement project. In 2011, a $45 million Student Apartment Complex opened on the west side of campus. It is Buffalo State's largest addition to campus student housing since the early 1970s.

== Academics ==
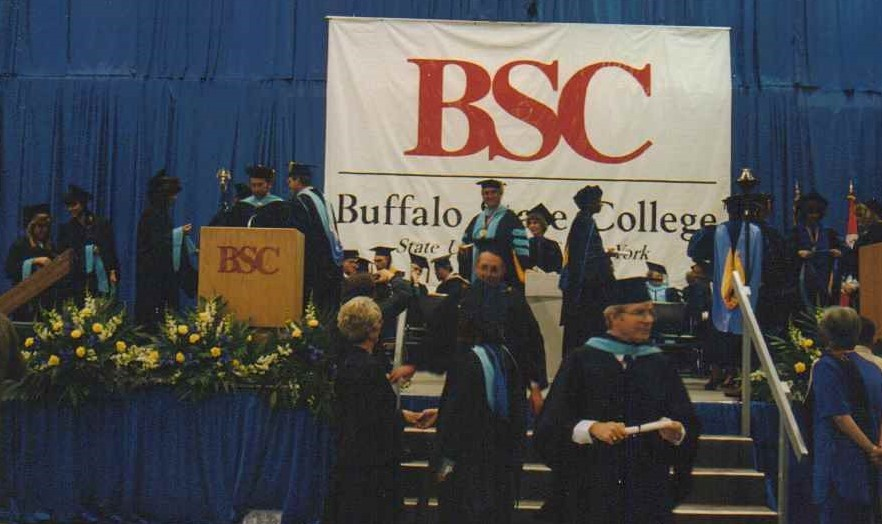
Buffalo State graduation in 1997

Buffalo State has 79 undergraduate majors with 11 honors options and 64 opportunities for graduate study, including 11 teacher certification programs. Fifty-one faculty members have been awarded the SUNY Chancellor's Award for Excellence in Teaching, and seven have been honored as SUNY Distinguished Teaching Professors.

More than 80 percent of all classes at Buffalo State have fewer than 40 students. Classes for undergraduate majors usually have between 12 and 15 students. As of 2026, Buffalo State faculty and professional staff members have been awarded the SUNY Chancellor's Award for Excellence over 200 times.

=== Schools ===
Buffalo State is composed of the School of Arts and Sciences and the School of Education and Applied Professions

=== Programs and centers ===
Programs available at Buffalo State that are not offered at any other SUNY institution include adult education, applied economics, art conservation, communication design, creativity, fashion and textile technology, fiber design, forensic chemistry, metal/jewelry design, higher education administration, urban and regional planning, and wood/furniture design. Buffalo State was the first school in the world to grant a master of science in creativity. The university also now offers an undergraduate minor in Creative Studies. Both programs are offered through the International Center for Studies in Creativity, which is housed on campus. Buffalo State has 12 centers promoting growth and excellence.

Others include:

- Center for Development of Human Services (CDHS)
- Center for Health and Social Research
- Great Lakes Center

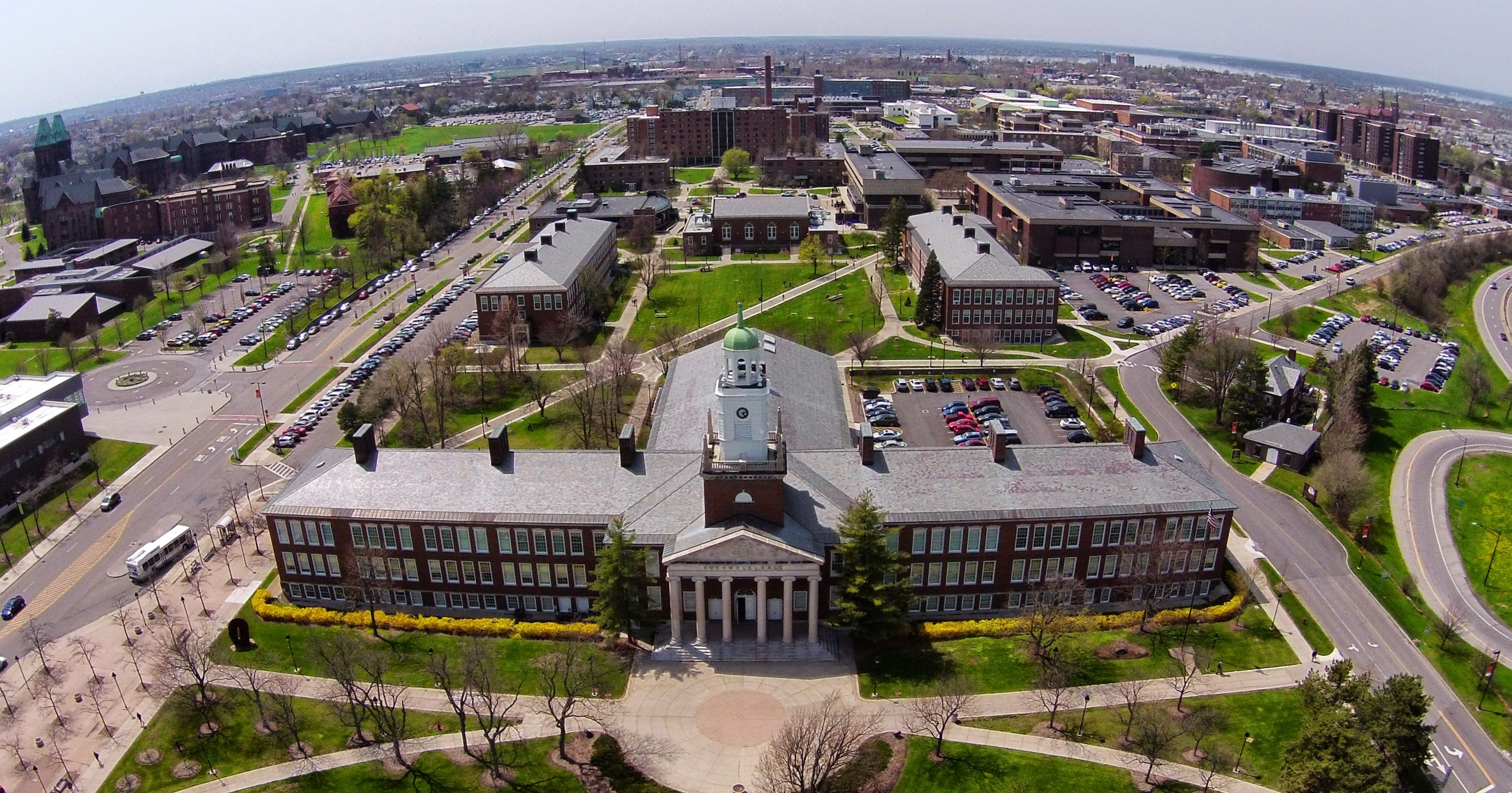
Aerial view

== Student life ==
Undergraduate demographics as of Fall 2023
Race and ethnicity	Total
White	45%
Black	30%
Hispanic	13%
Asian	7%
Two or more races	4%
American Indian/Alaska Native	1%
Economic diversity
Low-income (Note: The percentage of students who received an income-based federal Pell grant intended for low-income students.)	54%
Affluent (Note: The percentage of students who are a part of the American middle class at the bare minimum.)	46%

=== Demographics ===
There are 8,082 undergraduates and 1,036 graduate students enrolled. The undergraduate population (Fall 2018) was 43 percent male and 57 percent female. The overall admission rate of new students (2016) was 62 percent.

=== United Students Government ===
United Students Government (USG) represents the student body in campus governance and helps administrate student activities and organizations. USG provides activities, services, and student representation at Buffalo State. USG is headed by an executive branch of students elected each year along with a judicial branch and senate elected at the same time. USG manages and disperses money provided by the mandatory student activity fee to the many organizations and clubs on campus.

=== Athletics ===
Buffalo State's sports teams are known as the Bengals. Buffalo State competes in 16 varsity sports within NCAA Division III.

=== Club sports ===
Buffalo State also has four club sports funded by the United Students Government (USG): Pom Dance, rowing, men's rugby, and women's rugby.

=== Greek life ===
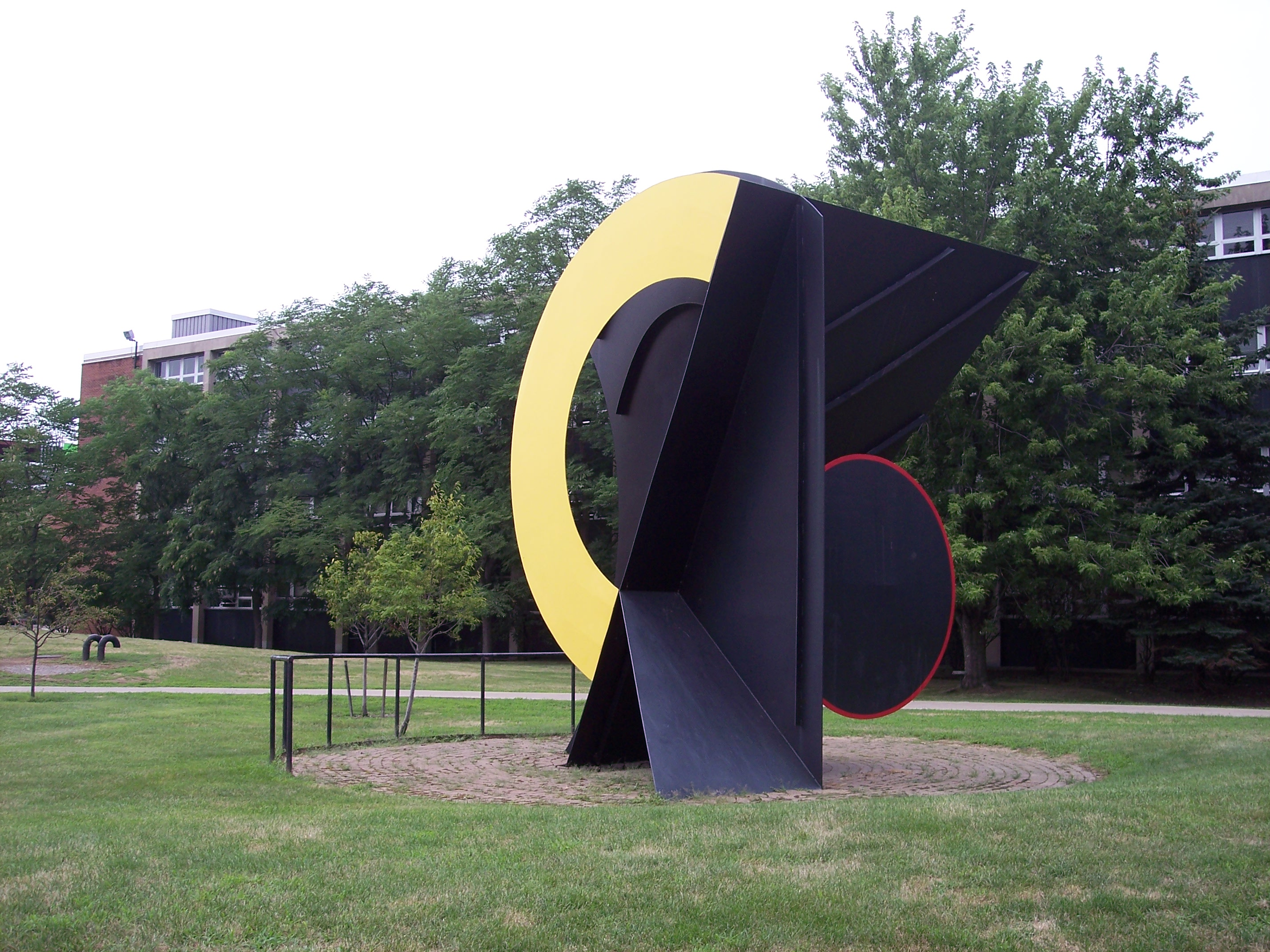
Cock-a-doodle-doo (1981) sculpture by Billie Lawless in front of Upton Hall

Buffalo State has an Inter-Greek Association to support the operation of fraternities and sororities on campus. There are 14 fraternities and sororities recognized at Buffalo State.

=== Media ===
- WBNY-FM 91.3 (MHz), student-run radio station
- The Record, the student-run newspaper, was published every Wednesday. It ceased being a print publication in 2016 and became online only starting in 2017.
- The Lens, an art, culture, and literary magazine
- 1300 Elmwood, magazine for alumni and friends, published biannually
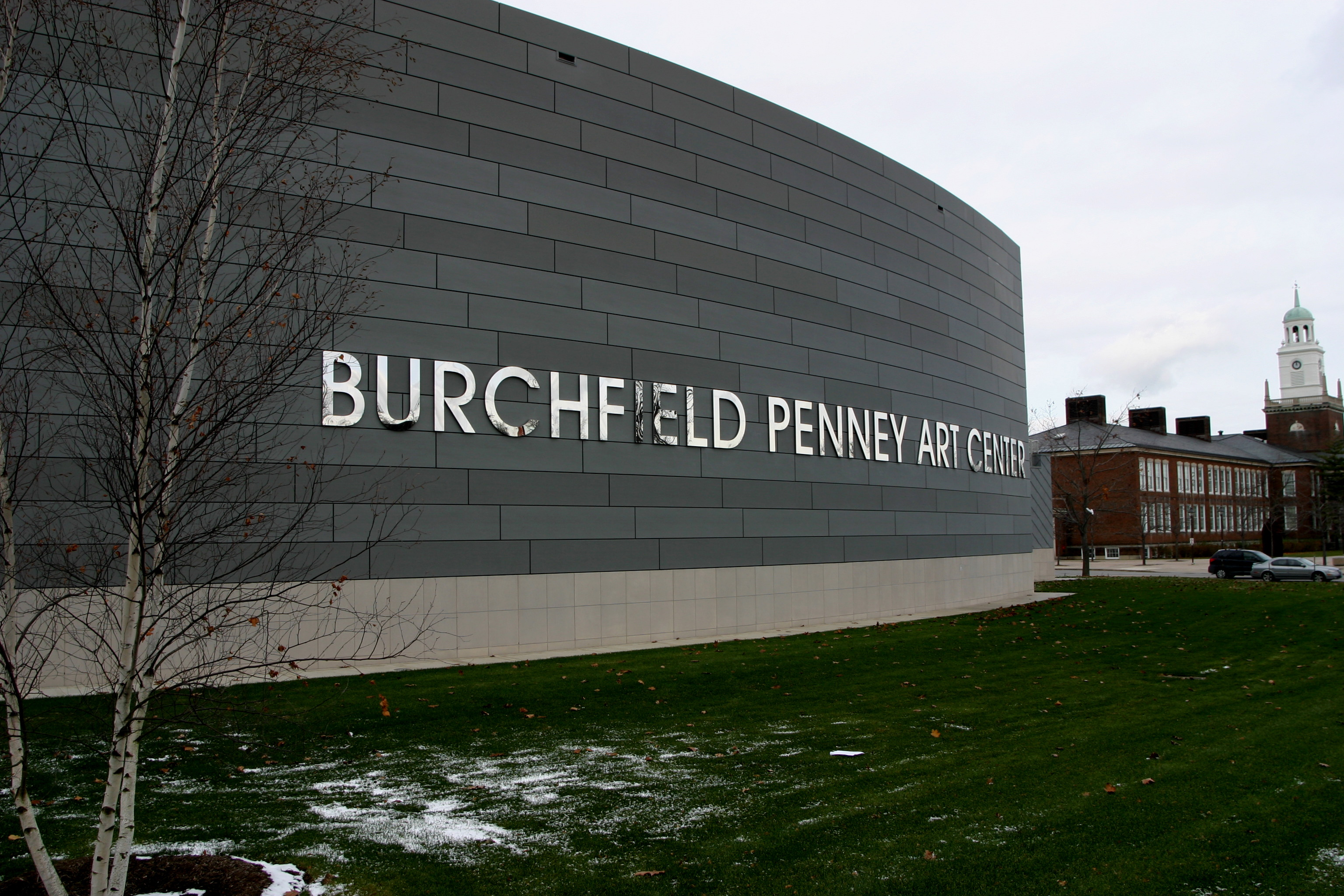
  Burchfield-Penney Art Center

=== Art ===
The campus's Burchfield Penney Art Center, founded in 1966, moved to its new $33 million facility in 2008. The Burchfield Penney features the work of Western New York artists and houses one of the world's largest collections of work by watercolorist Charles E. Burchfield (1893–1967). The historic Buffalo AKG Art Museum, which showcases modern and contemporary art, is located across the street from the campus. Students can purchase discount passes in the Student Union. There are also a number of other art galleries nearby.

== Notable people ==
Buffalo State has 100,000 alumni living in 119 countries throughout the world. Ninety-seven percent live in the United States, and 71 percent live in New York State. The five most popular majors among alumni were elementary education (15,538), art education (4,249), exceptional education (4,180), business studies (3,979), and criminal justice (3,911).

- Raven Baxter, molecular biologist and science communicator
- Susan Bies, former member of the Federal Reserve Board
- Byron Brown, former mayor of the City of Buffalo, New York
- Patrick B. Burke, member of the New York State Assembly
- Tom Clark, Commissioner of the Professional Bowlers Association (PBA)
- Grover Cleveland, 22nd and 24th president of the United States; member of the first board of directors of the Buffalo Normal School (1870); namesake of Cleveland Hall, the university's administration building
- William Conrad III, member of the New York State Assembly
- Francine DelMonte, former member of the New York State Assembly
- Beverly Eckert, member of 9/11 Family Steering Committee and co-chair of "Voices of September 11th"; died on Colgan Air Flight 3407
- Khadra Ahmed Dualeh, Somali Minister of Commerce and Industry from 2017 to 2018
- Diane English, writer, screenwriter, film director
- Tom Fontana, Emmy Award-winning writer and producer
- David Franczyk, member of the Buffalo Common Council
- Daniel Garcia, professional wrestler
- Bobby Gonzalez, former head coach of the men's basketball program at Seton Hall University
- Adelaide S. Hall (1857–1924), art connoisseur, curator, promoter and critic
- Mickey Harmon, artist and activist
- Brian Higgins, former member of the U.S. House of Representatives
- Muriel A. Howard, president of the American Association of State Colleges and Universities, former president of Buffalo State University, and a former vice president of the University at Buffalo.
- Sam Hoyt, Empire State Development regional president; former disgraced member of the New York State Assembly
- Sylvia Hyman (B.A. art education, 1938), ceramic artist
- Carolyn Lamm, partner, White & Case LLP; former president, American Bar Association
- Robert Longo, painter and sculptor
- Gary McNamara former talk host at WGR and WBEN; nationally syndicated talk host, Red Eye Radio, Cumulus Media Networks
- Sid Parnes, professor, co-founder International Center for Studies in Creativity
- Crystal Davis Peoples-Stokes, New York State assemblywoman, 141st District
- Ralph Raico, history professor and Austrian School economist
- John Rzeznik, lead singer and guitarist of Buffalo-native rock band Goo Goo Dolls; attended one year
- Abdi Salim, professional soccer player
- Christopher Scanlon, former mayor of the City of Buffalo, New York
- Tom Shannon, disk jockey at WKBW
- Cindy Sherman, photographer, film director and MacArthur Genius recipient
- George Starbuck, poet, educator
- Randy Smith, former NBA player and casino executive host
- Robert E. Wright, Nef Family Chair of Political Economy at Augustana College (South Dakota)

== Gallery ==
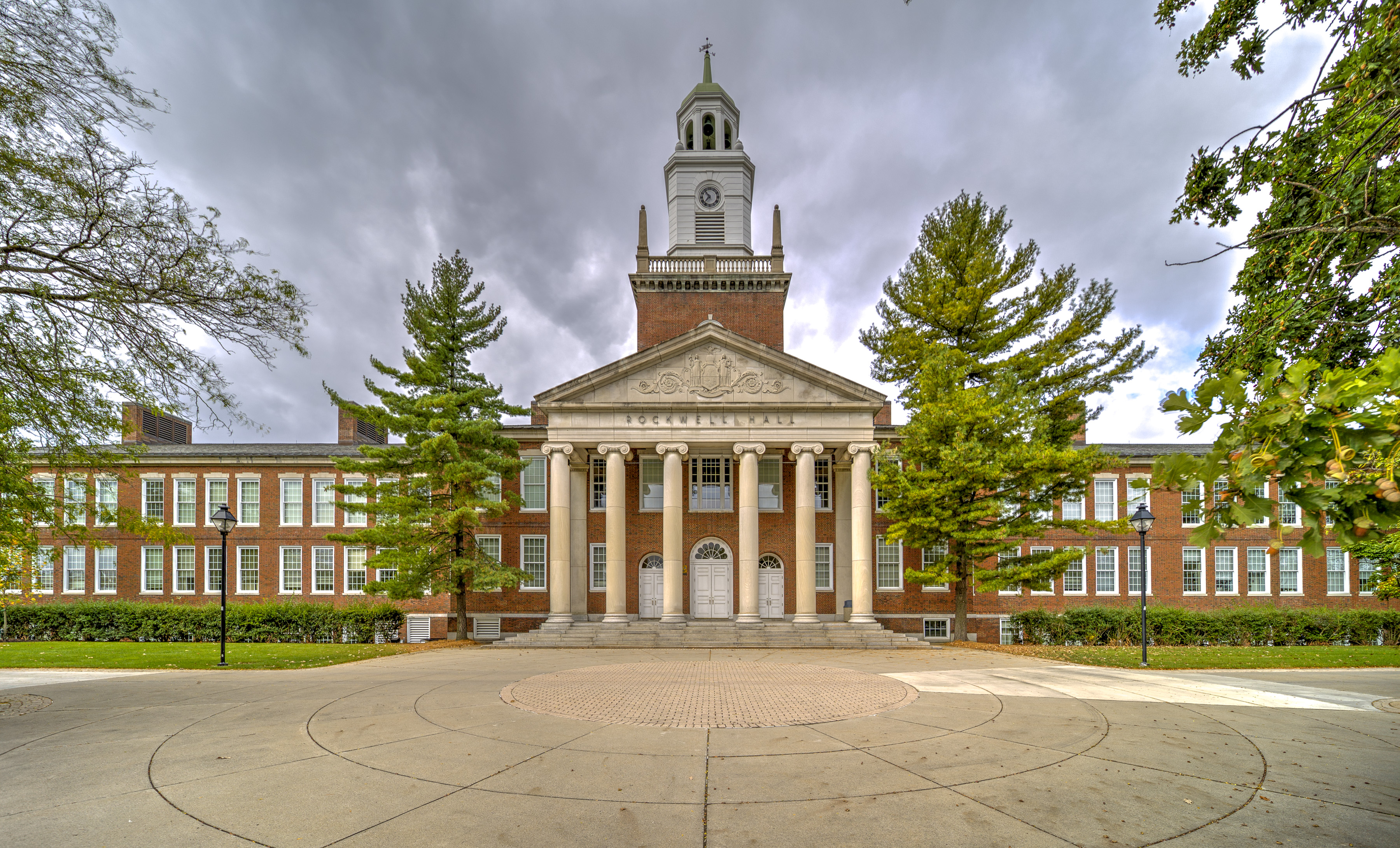
Rockwell Hall

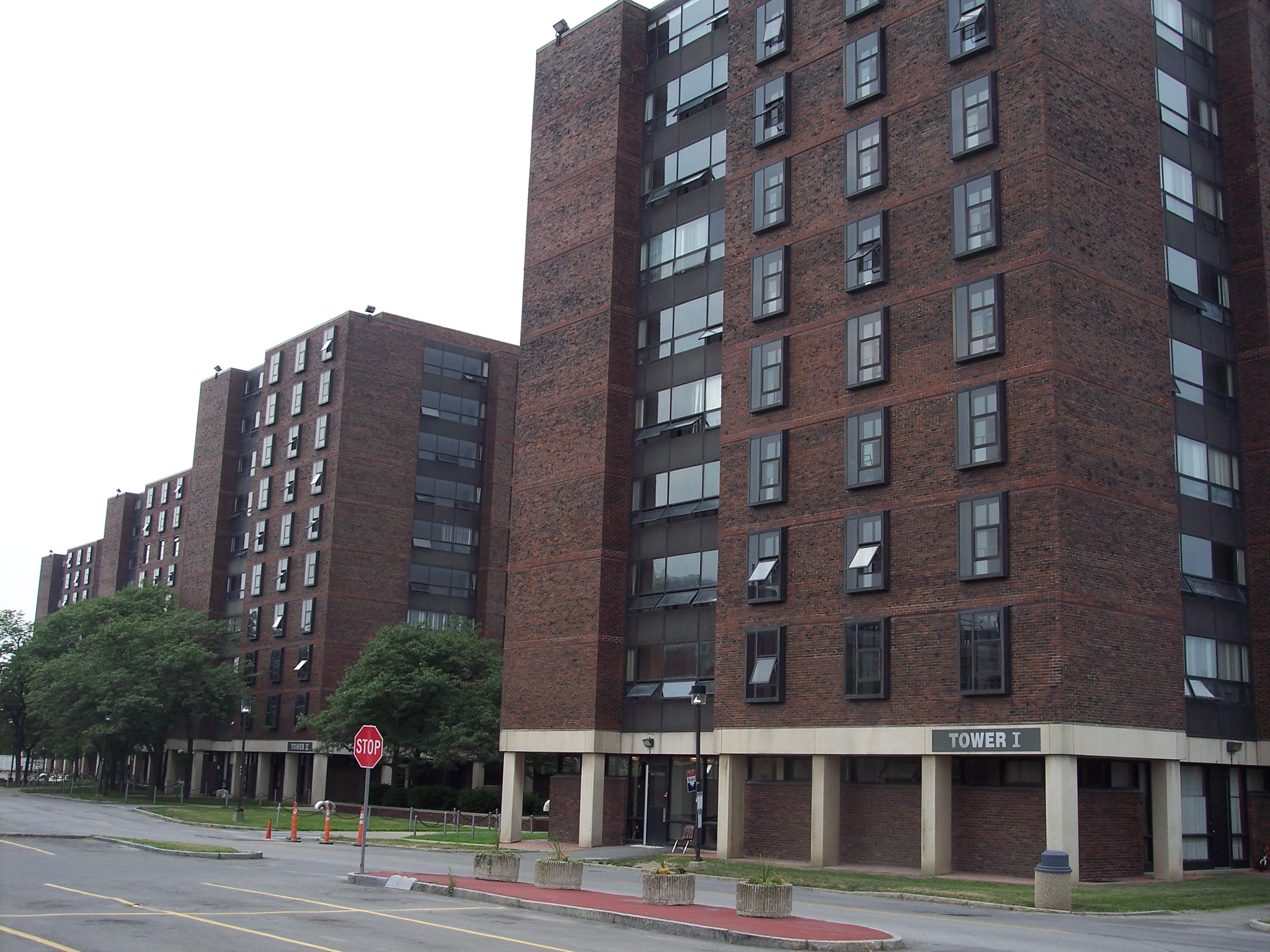
The Towers

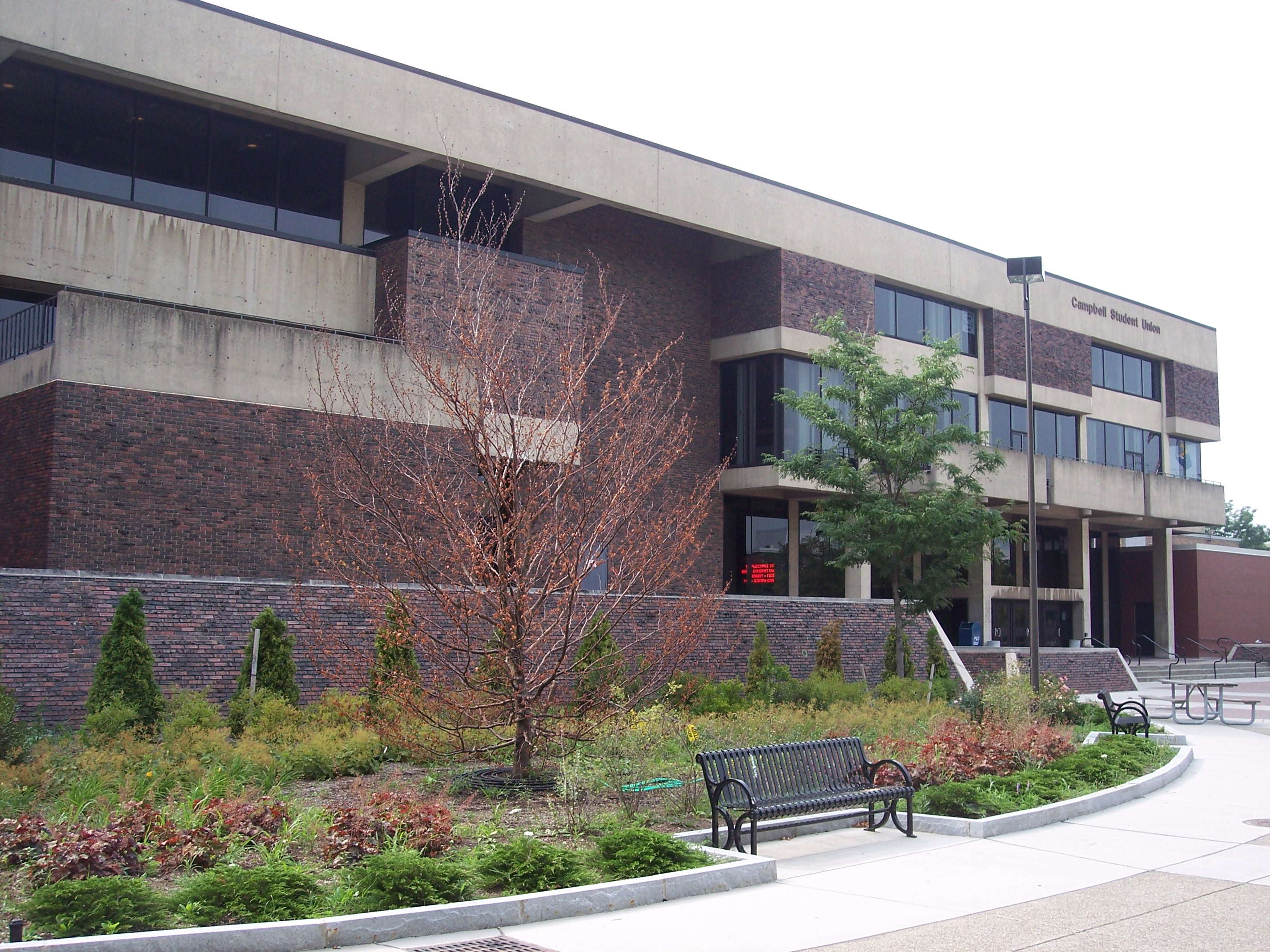
Campbell Student Union

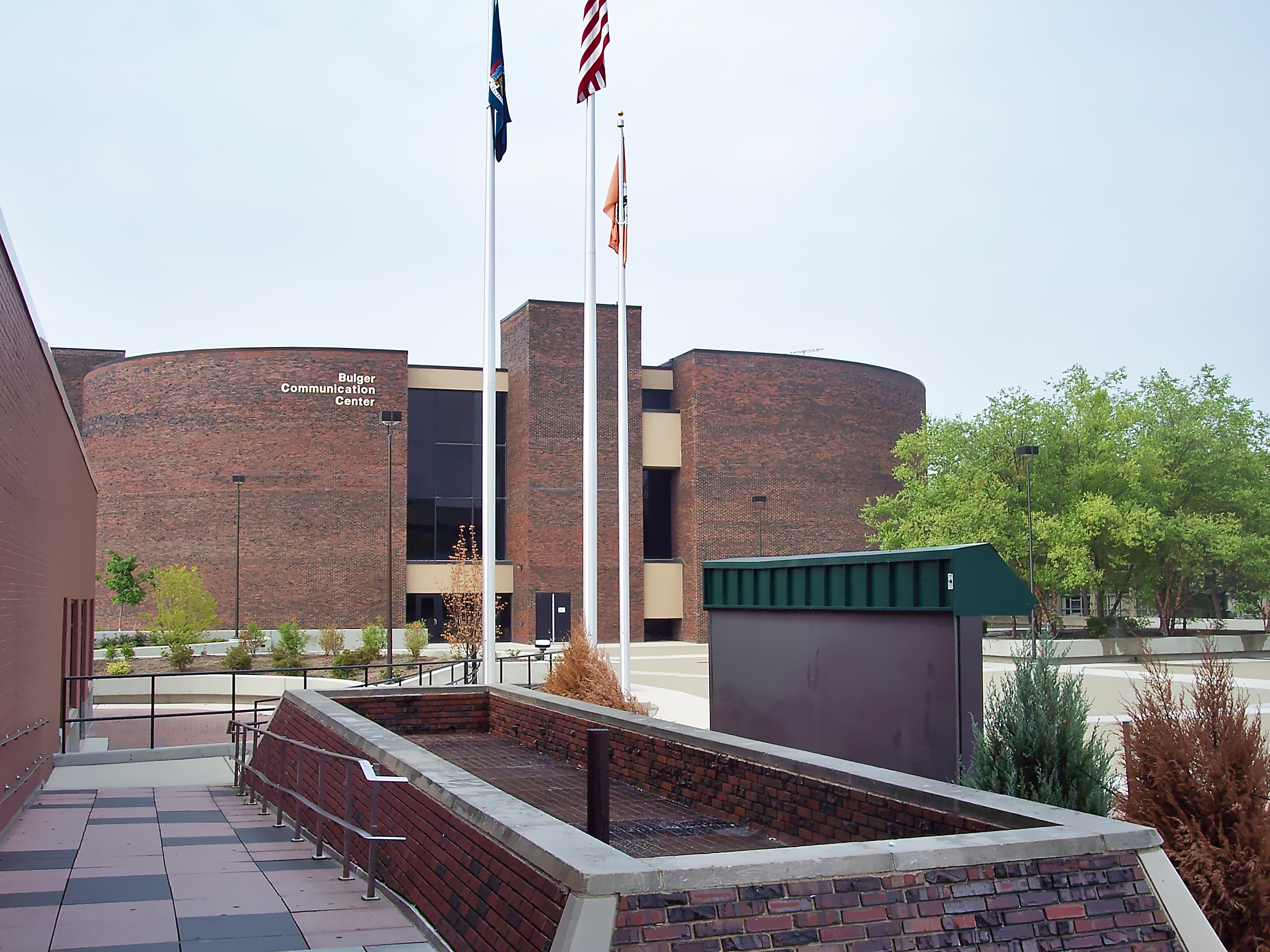
Bulger Communication Center

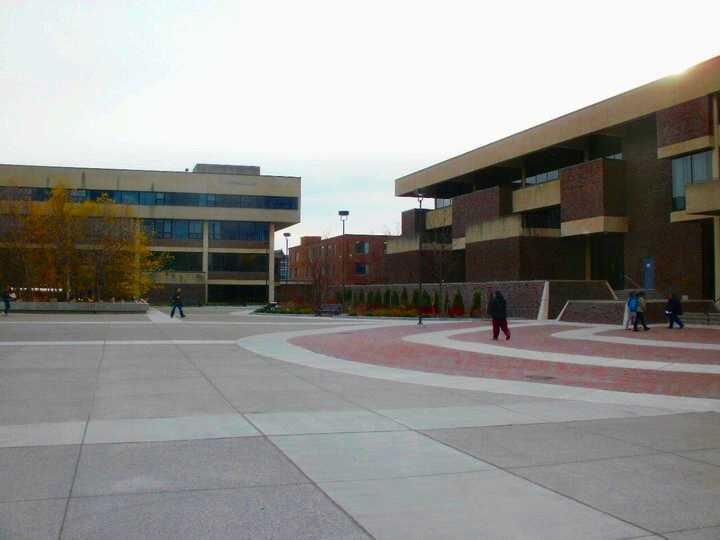
Student Union Quad
