= Beverly Eckert =

American activist (1951–2009)

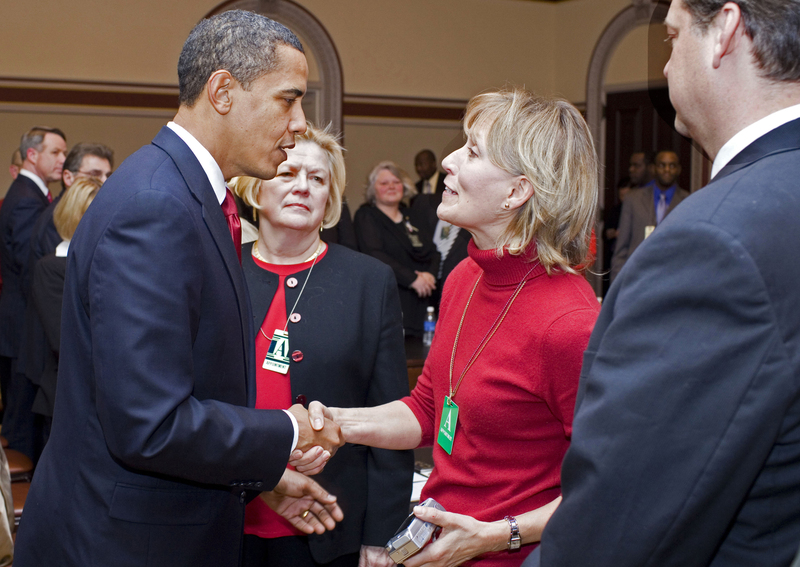
- Beverly Eckert shaking hands with President Barack Obama on February 6, 2009, 6 days before her death.
- Born: May 29, 1951; Buffalo, New York, U.S.
- Died: February 12, 2009 (aged 57); Clarence Center, New York, U.S.
- Resting place: New York City, New York, U.S.
- Education: State University of New York at Buffalo
- Known for: Member of 9/11 Family Steering Committee
- Spouse: Sean Rooney (m. 1980–2001; his death in the September 11 attacks)

Beverly Eckert (May 29, 1951 – February 12, 2009) was an American activist and advocate for the creation of the 9/11 Commission. She was one of the members of the 9/11 Family Steering Committee for the 9/11 Commission. Eckert's husband, Sean Rooney, died at age 50 in the attacks of September 11, 2001. She pushed for a commission to investigate 9/11 and to establish a memorial.

Eckert died at age 57 on February 12, 2009, in the crash of Colgan Air Flight 3407 in Clarence Center, New York. She had met with President Barack Obama just a few days before her death in her role as an advocate for those affected by 9/11.

== Before the September 11 attack ==
Eckert was born in 1951 in Buffalo, New York to Raymond and Helen Makarowski Eckert, and met her future husband, Sean P. Rooney, at a dance at Canisius High School, a Jesuit-run academy in that city, when both were 16 years old. Eckert attended the Buffalo Academy of the Sacred Heart, an all-girls high school in Eggertsville, New York. She received a degree in fine arts in 1975 from Buffalo State College, where in 2005 she gave the Baccalaureate Commencement Address. Rooney lived in Buffalo until 1978, working as a manager of restaurants, until he began working in the financial services industry and moving to Massachusetts, New Jersey and Connecticut. When he died he was a vice president for risk management services at the Aon Corporation. He worked on the 98th floor of the World Trade Center's south tower, one of 32 employees in Aon's offices there.

The couple, who had no children and lived in the Glenbrook section of Stamford, Connecticut, had been married 21 years when Rooney died. Before Rooney's death, they had celebrated their 50th birthdays with vacations to Vermont, to mark his, and Morocco, to mark hers.

== September 11, 2001 ==
When the planes hit the World Trade Center, Rooney called his wife and exchanged voice mail messages with her. To get to safety, he made his way to the 105th floor of his building, trying to reach the roof, when he became trapped until the tower collapsed, killing him.

After Eckert learned about the attacks, she went home and stayed on the phone with her husband until she heard the tower collapse. She described the incident in a StoryCorps interview.

== After September 11 ==
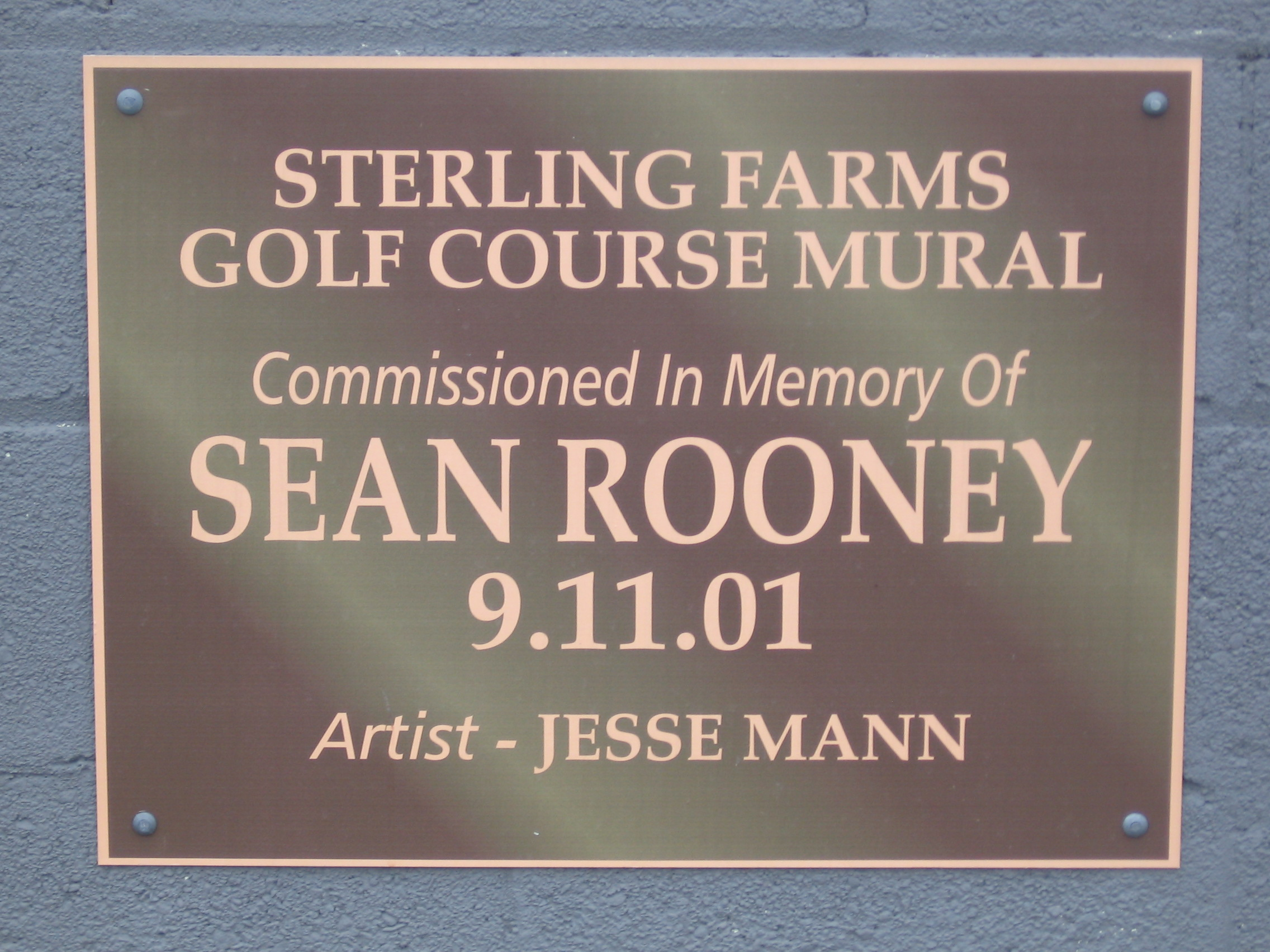
Plaque at the mural at Glenbrook train station

Eckert became a leading activist among 9/11 victims' families, joining with others in lobbying for creation of the 9/11 Commission, improvements to national security, and for creation of a memorial at the World Trade Center site. In pressing federal elected officials to do a better job in protecting Americans from terrorism, she was among a number of 9/11 victims' family members active in pressing for sweeping reforms of U.S. intelligence. She also spoke in opposition to the wars in Iraq and Afghanistan.

Eckert was the co-chairperson of the group Voices of September 11.

Locally, Eckert worked with Stamford city officials on various memorial projects. She left her job at General Re and volunteered with Habitat for Humanity and, beginning in September 2008, as a tutor at the Julia A. Stark Elementary School. She was also a member of the Glenbrook Neighborhood Association. In honor of her husband and other victims, Eckert planted birch trees near a trail in Cove Island Park where she and Rooney learned to in-line skate. At the Glenbrook train station, where her husband commuted to work, she commissioned a mural and planted a sycamore tree as a memorial. Shortly before her death, she joined a neighborhood association committee to improve the station.

On December 19, 2003, Eckert published her famous manifesto, "My Silence Cannot be Bought:"

I've chosen to go to court rather than accept a payoff from the 9/11 victims compensation fund. Instead, I want to know what went so wrong with our intelligence and security systems that a band of religious fanatics was able to turn four U.S passenger jets into an enemy force, attack our cities and kill 3,000 civilians with terrifying ease. I want to know why two 110-story skyscrapers collapsed in less than two hours and why escape and rescue options were so limited. . . . The victims fund was not created in a spirit of compassion. Rather, it was a tacit acknowledgement by Congress that it tampered with our civil justice system in an unprecedented way. . . . So I say to Congress, big business and everyone who conspired to divert attention from government and private-sector failures: My husband's life was priceless, and I will not let his death be meaningless. My silence cannot be bought.

== Death ==
Eckert was killed on February 12, 2009, in the crash of Colgan Air Flight 3407 outside of Buffalo, New York. She was traveling to Buffalo for a gathering with her family to mark what would have been Rooney's 58th birthday on February 15. A ceremony had also been scheduled at Canisius High School in which she was to award a student with a memorial scholarship in Rooney's honor.

A week before her death, Eckert met with U.S. President Barack Obama, to discuss detainees at Guantanamo Bay and other matters. In a press conference after her death, Obama described her as a "tireless advocate for the families, those whose lives were forever changed on that September day."

On June 18, 2009, Margot Eckert, executor of her sister's estate, filed a lawsuit in New Haven, Connecticut, against Colgan Air, Pinnacle Air and Continental Airlines, claiming they were responsible for the crash.
