= Jersey Girls =

Four widows who lost their husbands on 9/11

The Jersey Girls or Jersey Widows refers to four American women whose husbands died in the September 11 attacks. All four—Kristen Breitweiser, Patty Casazza, Lorie Van Auken, and Mindy Kleinberg—were residents of New Jersey, and helped lobby the U.S. government to carry out an investigation into the terrorist attacks, resulting in the formation of the 9/11 Commission and the subsequent report released by the Commission.

== Establishment of the 9/11 Commission ==
Survivors and family members of the victims were the most vocal and persistent in the call for the creation of an independent commission to investigate the 9/11 attacks. The leaders of several 9/11 family groups began to work together to lobby political leaders. The Jersey Girls were part of the 9/11 Family Steering Committee, whose members were instrumental in the creation of the 9/11 Commission and in pressing the commission to oversee a thorough and credible investigation. According to Matthew Purdy of The New York Times: "The commission grew largely out of pressure from families of victims, including four New Jersey widows who call themselves 'the Jersey Girls.' It's no mistake that the White House put New Jersey's most popular politician (Tom Kean) in charge."

Kean became the Commission's Chairman after Henry Kissinger resigned the position; according to Peter Lance, "The Jersey Girls could take some of the credit for his hasty departure." Van Auken told Lance:

We were shocked. Kissinger had huge conflicts of interest -- major dealings with the Saudis ... The day before he resigned, we had a meeting with him in his office in Manhattan. Kristen [Breitweiser] had done impeccable research. She'd looked up all of his companies. So I asked him, 'Mr. Kissinger, do you have any Saudi clients?' He mumbled something. And then he asked if someone would pour him some coffee. So then I said, 'Do you happen to have any clients by the name of bin Laden? He almost fell off the couch.

A few months before the Commission released its report, Kean said that the Jersey Girls "call me all the time. They monitor us, they follow our progress, they've provided us with some of the best questions we've asked. I doubt very much if we would be in existence without them."

== Appointment of Philip D. Zelikow ==
The eventual appointment of Philip D. Zelikow to the position of Executive Director of the 9/11 Commission was also troubling to the Jersey Girls who demanded his resignation. They cited close personal ties with the Bush family and the National Security Advisor as conflicts of interest. Mindy Kleinberg said, "As executive director, he has pretty much the most important job on the commission. He hires the staff, he sets the direction and focus, he chooses witnesses at the hearings." Joe Conason wrote that the widows "fear that even with the best of intentions, Zelikow's connections to the Bush White House will 'taint the validity' of the commission's final report. Their demand that he resign or be fired has been rejected by the commission's co-chairmen, former New Jersey Gov. Thomas Kean and former Indiana Rep. Lee Hamilton. 'We respectfully disagree with them,' replied Al Felzenberg, the commission's press spokesman, who said Zelikow was chosen 'for his scholarly credentials and his knowledge of national security issues.' He hastened to praise the widows for doing 'a very positive thing,' adding that while he understood their concerns, he expected that "they're not going to be satisfied with everything we do."

== Criticism of the Commission ==
As part of the 9/11 Family Steering Committee they helped form, the Jersey Girls monitored and often criticized the 9/11 Commission after they lobbied successfully for its creation. The Jersey Girls pressured the U.S. government for months to have National Security Adviser Condoleezza Rice testify in front of the Commission; when she refused to testify under oath in March 2004, "they walked out in silent protest." The White House, in a "dramatic about-face," gave in and Rice testified.

When it became clear to them that the Commission had omitted crucial information from its report, the widows called for a new independent panel. "I'm very disturbed, and I want to get some answers," said Breitweiser. "I want to know what the truth is." She called the 2004 findings "an utterly hollow report."

== Congressional testimony ==
The Jersey Widows testified before a hearing chaired by Congresswoman Cynthia McKinney on July 22, 2005.

== Political controversy ==
The Jersey Girls have been the target of attacks at various times. In 2004, Frank Rich wrote in the New York Times:

The phenomenon has sufficiently alarmed the White House that earlier in the month its media allies tried to discredit the 9/11 families, particularly the so-called 'Jersey Girls,' the four telegenic suburban widows who have forced the administration to reverse its stonewalling of the 9/11 commission at nearly every juncture. Rush Limbaugh labeled Kristen Breitweiser a Democratic operative. Bill O'Reilly sounded the alarm that 'some 9/11 families have aligned themselves with the far left.' But this stab at damage control went nowhere.

In her book Godless: The Church of Liberalism (2006), conservative commentator Ann Coulter created a firestorm of controversy with her remarks about the Jersey Girls. Coulter wrote:

They first came together to complain that the $1.6 million average settlement to be paid to 9/11 victims' families by the government was not large enough ... These broads are millionaires, lionized on TV and in articles about them, reveling in their status as celebrities ... These self-obsessed women seemed genuinely unaware that 9/11 was an attack on our nation and acted as if the terrorist attacks happened only to them. ... I've never seen people enjoying their husbands' deaths so much ... the Democrat ratpack gals endorsed John Kerry for president ... cutting campaign commercials ... how do we know their husbands weren't planning to divorce these harpies? Now that their shelf life is dwindling, they'd better hurry up and appear in Playboy.

These statements received national attention after an interview on The Today Show, and were widely criticized. The Jersey Girls themselves also responded critically to Coulter's remarks. Kristen Breitweiser stated: "I'd like her to meet my daughter and tell her how anyone could enjoy their father's death ... She sounds like a very disturbed, unraveled person." Lorie Van Auken said she "was stunned by the vitriol"; and "Having my husband burn alive in a building brought me no joy. Watching it unfold on national TV and seeing it repeated endlessly was beyond what I could describe. Telling my children they would never see their father again was not fun. And we had no plans to divorce."

Nevertheless, Coulter has repeated her criticism of the Jersey Girls.

I feel sorry for all the widows of 9/11 ... [but] I do not believe that sanctifies their political message. ... They have attacked Bush, they have attacked Condoleezza Rice, they're cutting campaign commercials for Kerry. But we can't respond because their husbands died ... I think it's one of the ugliest things the left has done ... this idea that you need some sort of personal authenticity in order to make a political point ...

The New York Daily News reported that the Jersey Girls "tried to stay above the name-calling fray" by emphasizing that

the nation shouldn't focus on Coulter's words but on security problems like porous borders, wasteful Homeland Security funding and intelligence agencies that don't work together. 'Our only motivation ever was to make our nation safer,' they said in a statement. 'We have been slandered. Contrary to Ms. Coulter's statements, there was no joy in watching men that we loved burn alive. There was no happiness in telling our children that their fathers were never coming home again. We adored these men and miss them every day.'

And Senator Hillary Clinton found it "unimaginable that anyone in the public eye could launch a vicious, mean-spirited attack on people whom I've known over the last four and a half years to be concerned deeply about the safety and security of our country."

After the 9/11 Commission issued its report, the Jersey Girls pressured the Administration to follow its recommendations. They specifically commended the Commission for not politicizing blame in the report. "The USS Cole was bombed under Clinton's watch, and 9/11 happened under Bush's watch," said Rosemary Dillard. "I don't blame either administration; I blame the people who were reporting to them." As the 2004 election neared, the widows criticized Bush for the failure to enact the recommendations of the commission; many interpreted this as an endorsement of Bush's opponent John Kerry; the New York Times reported, "In a statement clearly meant to influence voters in next week's election, the group did not explicitly endorse Senator John Kerry, the Democratic presidential candidate, but said Mr. Bush had 'allowed members of his own party to derail the legislative process.'" There were other 9/11 victims' families who supported the Bush campaign. For example, Debra Burlingame, whose brother flew in the plane that was crashed into the Pentagon, responded to the widows: "The Jersey Girls criticized President Bush because he wasn't rounding up Arabs in airport lounges before Sept. 11. These are the same people who are now decrying the use of the Patriot Act."

== Media appearances ==
The Jersey Widows were interviewed on the television series NOW on PBS and in the documentary film 9/11: Press for Truth (2006).

== Recognition ==
Kristen Breitweiser won the Ron Ridenhour Prize for "truth-telling", in 2005, for her work with the Jersey Girls.
