= Sister Beiter conjecture =

Conjecture on the coefficients of cyclotomic polynomials

In mathematics, the Sister Beiter conjecture is a conjecture about the size of coefficients of ternary cyclotomic polynomials (i.e. where the index is the product of three prime numbers). It is named after Marion Beiter, a Catholic nun who first proposed it in 1968.

== Background ==
For $n\in\mathbb{N}_{>0}$ the maximal coefficient (in absolute value) of the cyclotomic polynomial $\Phi_n(x)$ is denoted by $A(n)$.

Let $3\leq p\leq q\leq r$ be three prime numbers. In this case the cyclotomic polynomial $\Phi_{pqr}(x)$ is called ternary. In 1895, A. S. Bang proved that $A(pqr)\leq p-1$. This implies the existence of $M(p):=\max\limits_{p\leq q\leq r\text{ prime}}A(pqr)$ such that $1\leq M(p)\leq p-1$.

== Statement ==
Sister Beiter conjectured in 1968 that $M(p)\leq \frac{p+1}{2}$. This was later disproved, but a corrected Sister Beiter conjecture was put forward as $M(p)\leq \frac{2}{3}p$.

== Status ==
A preprint from 2023 explains the history in detail and claims to prove this corrected conjecture. Explicitly it claims to prove $M(p)\leq\frac{2}{3}p \text{ and } \lim\limits_{p\rightarrow\infty}\frac{M(p)}{p}= \frac{2}{3}.$
