= Sisters of St. Francis of Penance and Christian Charity =

Catholic religious congregation for women

The Sisters of St. Francis of Penance and Christian Charity is a Catholic religious congregation for women. A third order Regular [not Secular] group, the sisters are not cloistered nuns but active in the world, having historically been primarily involved in teaching, although they have participated in the care of the sick and poor, hospital work, mission work, and other activities.

== History ==
The international congregation was founded by Mother Magdalen (Catherine) Daemen (1787–1858) in 1835 in the town of Heythuysen in the Netherlands. The Sisters were asked by Jesuit priests in Buffalo to come and serve the Catholic families of German descent who were living there. In 1874, the first three missionary sisters, accompanied by General Superior Mother Aloysia Lenders, arrived in Buffalo, New York. The Sisters began serving in the Diocese of Buffalo. There are now ten provinces, worldwide, with the central administration in Rome, Italy.

== Provinces ==
- Generalate (Central administration) - Rome, Italy
- St. Francis Province - Redwood City, California, USA
- Sacred Heart Province - Denver, Colorado, USA
- Holy Name Province - Stella Niagara Education Park, Lewiston, New York, USA
- Province of Divine Providence - Heythuysen, Netherlands
- Christ the King Province - Ludinghausen, Germany
- Mary Immaculate Province - Nonnenwerth, Germany
- Mary Help of Christians Province - Orlik, Poland
- St. Clare Mission - Tanzania, East Africa
- Holy Trinity Province - Indonesia
- Sacred Heart of Jesus Province - São Leopoldo, Brazil; Immaculate Heart of Mary Province - Santa Maria, Brazil; and Our Lady of Providence Province - São Paulo, Brazil
- Holy Name Province - Chiapas, Mexico

The province in Tanzania is designated as an international mission.

== Additional ministries ==
The Sisters of St. Francis of Stella Niagara (Holy Name Province, USA) additionally minister in the American states of Ohio, West Virginia, New Jersey, and Florida. They also operate a school, convent, peace site, and hospitality center in New York State. The school is known as Stella Niagara Education Park.

International ministries of the congregation exist in other countries throughout the world. Currently these are located in Argentina, Belarus, East Timor, Guatemala, and Mexico.

== See also ==
- Catholic Church
- St. Francis of Assisi
- Third Order of St. Francis
