= Stella Niagara, New York =

- Hamlet
- Location within New York Location within the United States
- Coordinates: 43°12′07″N 79°02′32″W
- Country: United States
- State: New York
- County: Niagara
- Elevation: 318 ft (97 m)
- Time zone: UTC-5 (Eastern (EST))
  - Summer (DST): UTC-4 (EDT)
- ZIP code: 14144
- Area code: 716
- GNIS feature ID: 966344

Stella Niagara is a hamlet in Niagara County, New York, United States. The community is located along the Niagara River and New York State Route 18F, 7.3 miles (11.7 km) north of Niagara Falls. Stella Niagara is primarily known for being the home of the Sisters of St. Francis of Penance and Christian Charity. Stella Niagara Education Park, a Montessori through 8th Grade private elementary school, is also located on property. More recently, it has seen the creation of the Stella Niagara Preserve, the largest privately owned, undeveloped tract of land along the entire length of the Niagara River, when the Land Conservancy purchased this remarkable property from the Sisters of St. Francis in 2015. Stella Niagara had a post office until July 19, 1997; it still has its own ZIP code, 14144.
