= Heythuysen =

Heythuysen Heitse (Limburgish)
- Village
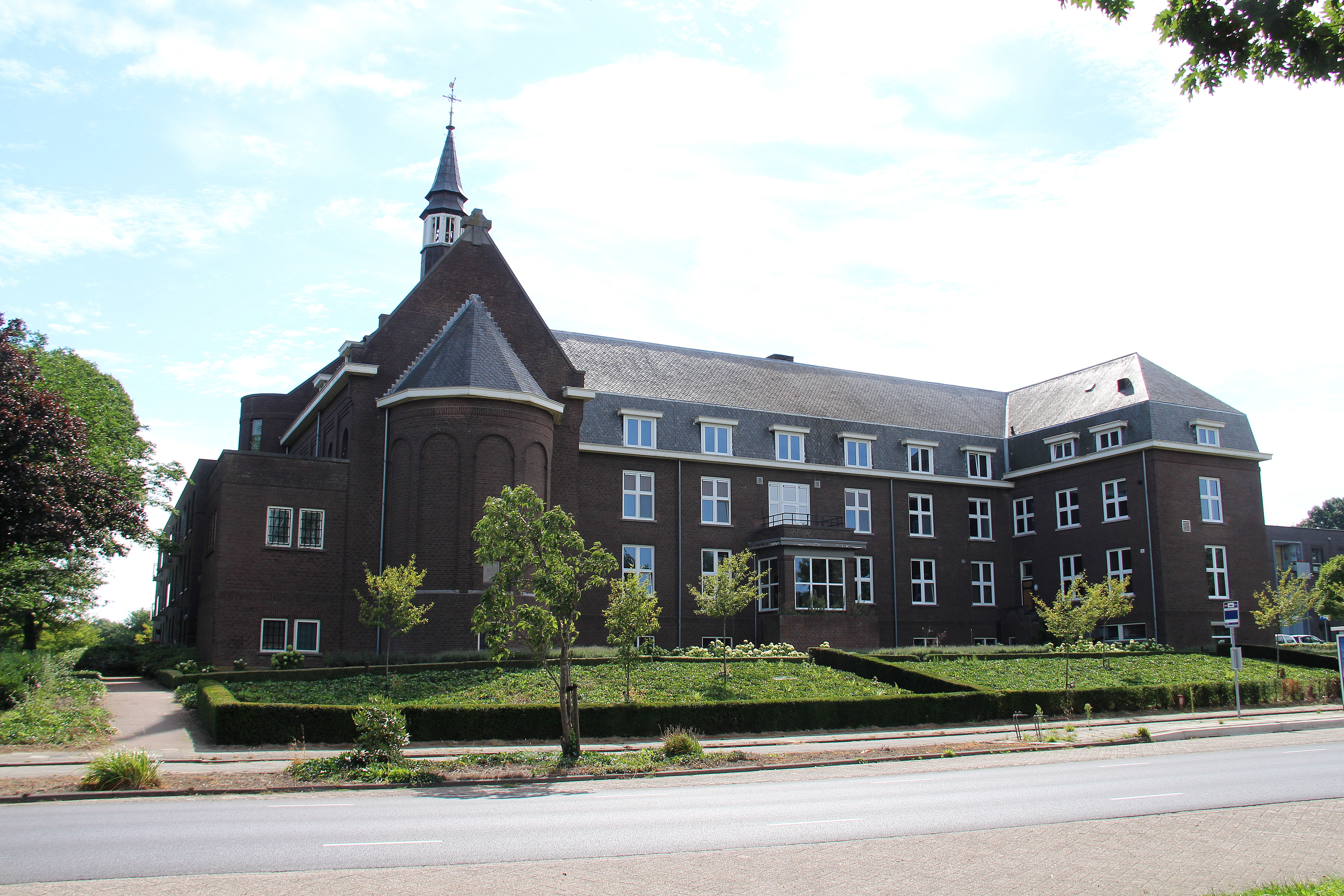
- Retirement home and former monastery of the White Fathers of St Charles

- Location in the Netherlands Location in the province of Limburg in the Netherlands
- Country: Netherlands
- Province: Limburg
- Municipality: Leudal

Area
  - Total: 27.55 km^{2} (10.64 sq mi)
- Elevation: 28 m (92 ft)

Population (2021)
  - Total: 6,545
  - Density: 237.6/km^{2} (615.3/sq mi)
- Time zone: UTC+1 (CET)
  - Summer (DST): UTC+2 (CEST)
- Postal code: 6093
- Dialing code: 0475
- Major roads: N279

Heythuysen (Dutch: [ˈɦɛitˌɦœyzə(n)]; Limburgish: Heitse) is a town in the south-eastern Netherlands.

== History ==
It was first mentioned in 1383 as Heythusen, and means "houses on the heath". It was located on the road from Venlo to Antwerp, and between the Bevelandse beek and the Tungelroyse beek. In 1243, it became a border town for the County of Horne. In 1680, Heythuysen became an independent heerlijkheid.

The Catholic St Nicolaas Church is a three-aisled church which was built shortly after 1504. In 1847, the current Gothic Revival tower was built. In 1927, the church was enlarged.

Heythuysen was home to 275 people in 1840. Until it became a part of Leudal on 1 January 2007, Heythuysen was a separate municipality, including the villages of Baexem, Grathem and Kelpen-Oler. Heythuysen is home of the Grand Café Tom Tom.

== Gallery ==
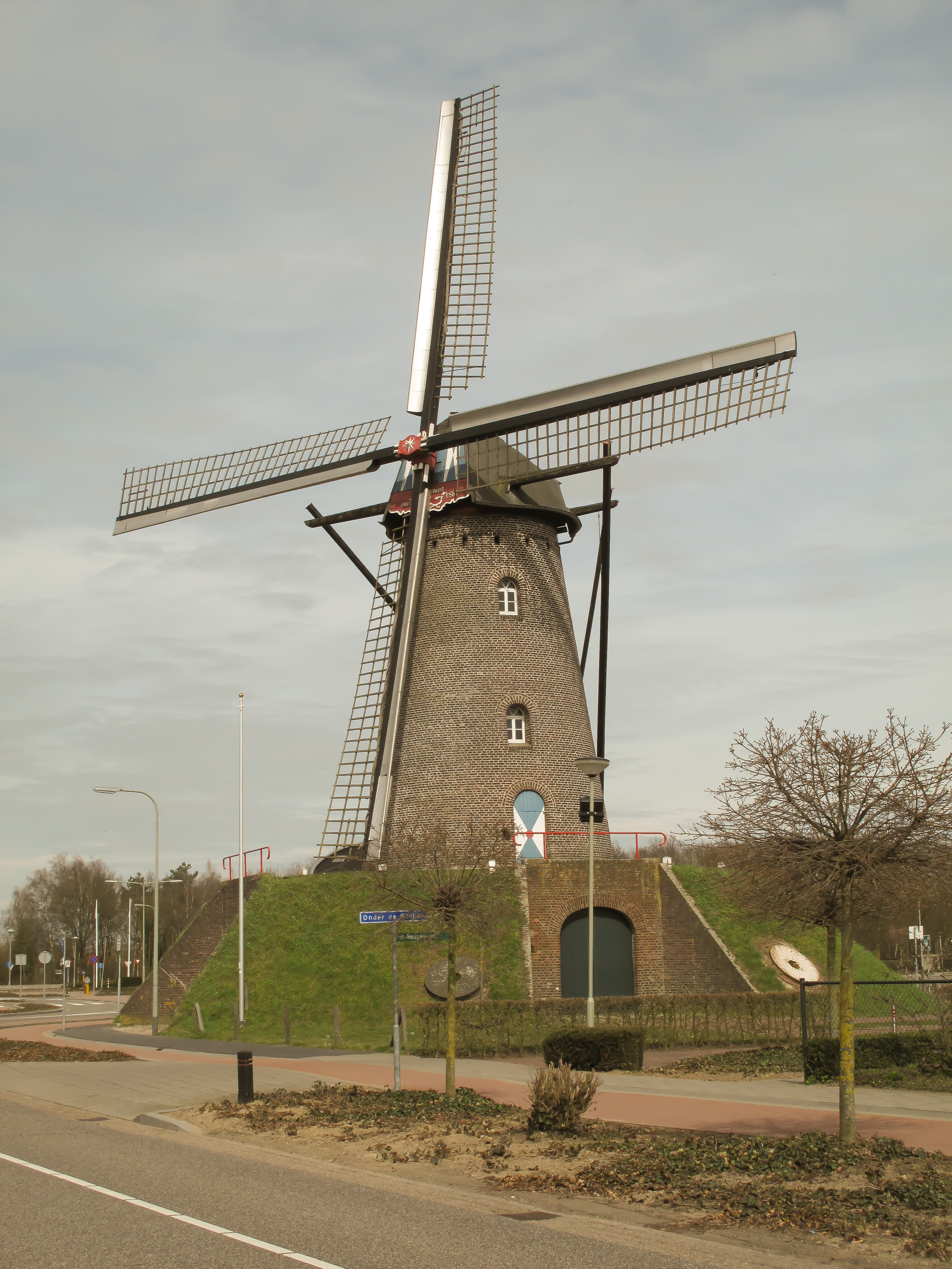
Windmill: de Sint Antoniusmolen

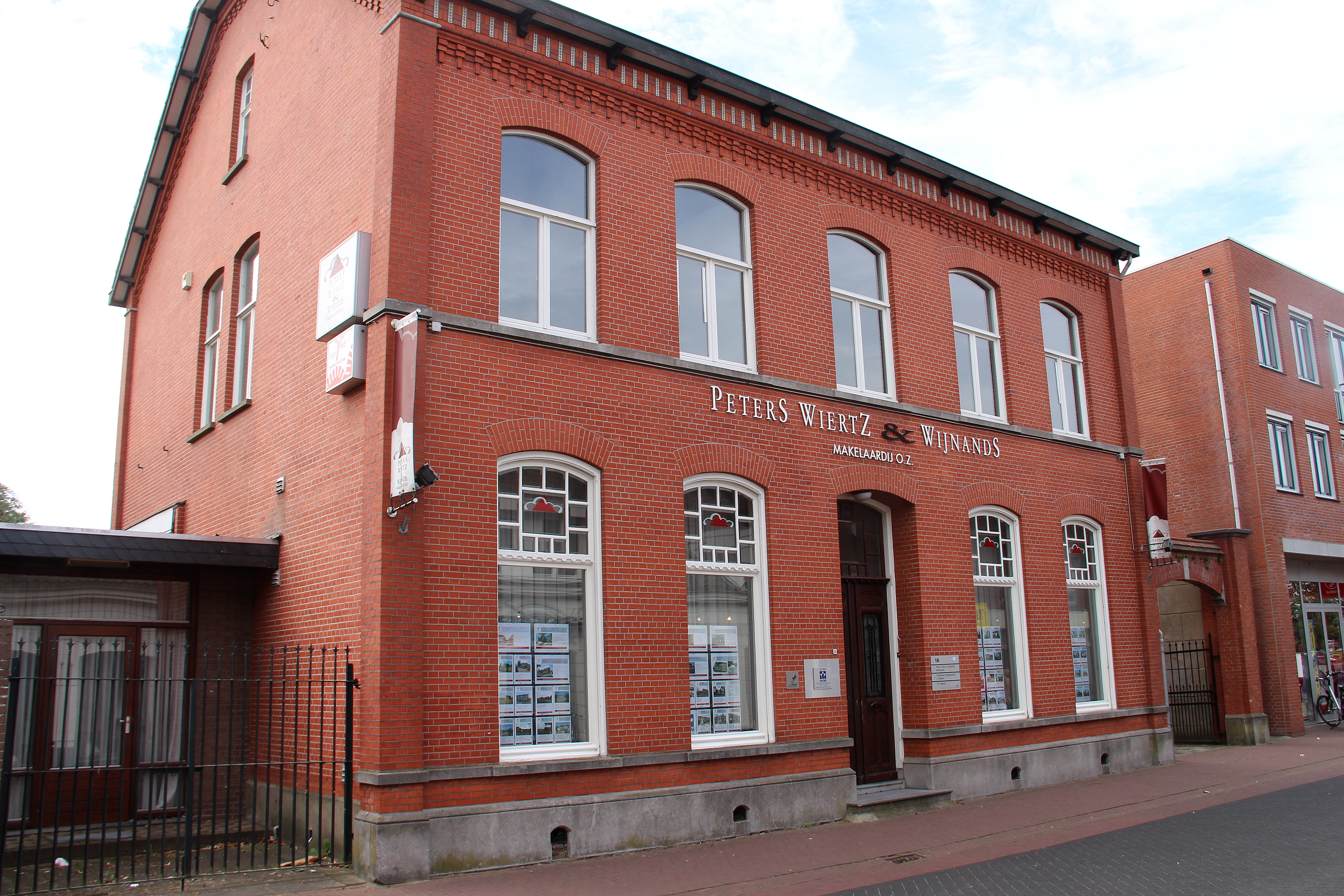
Building in Heythuysen

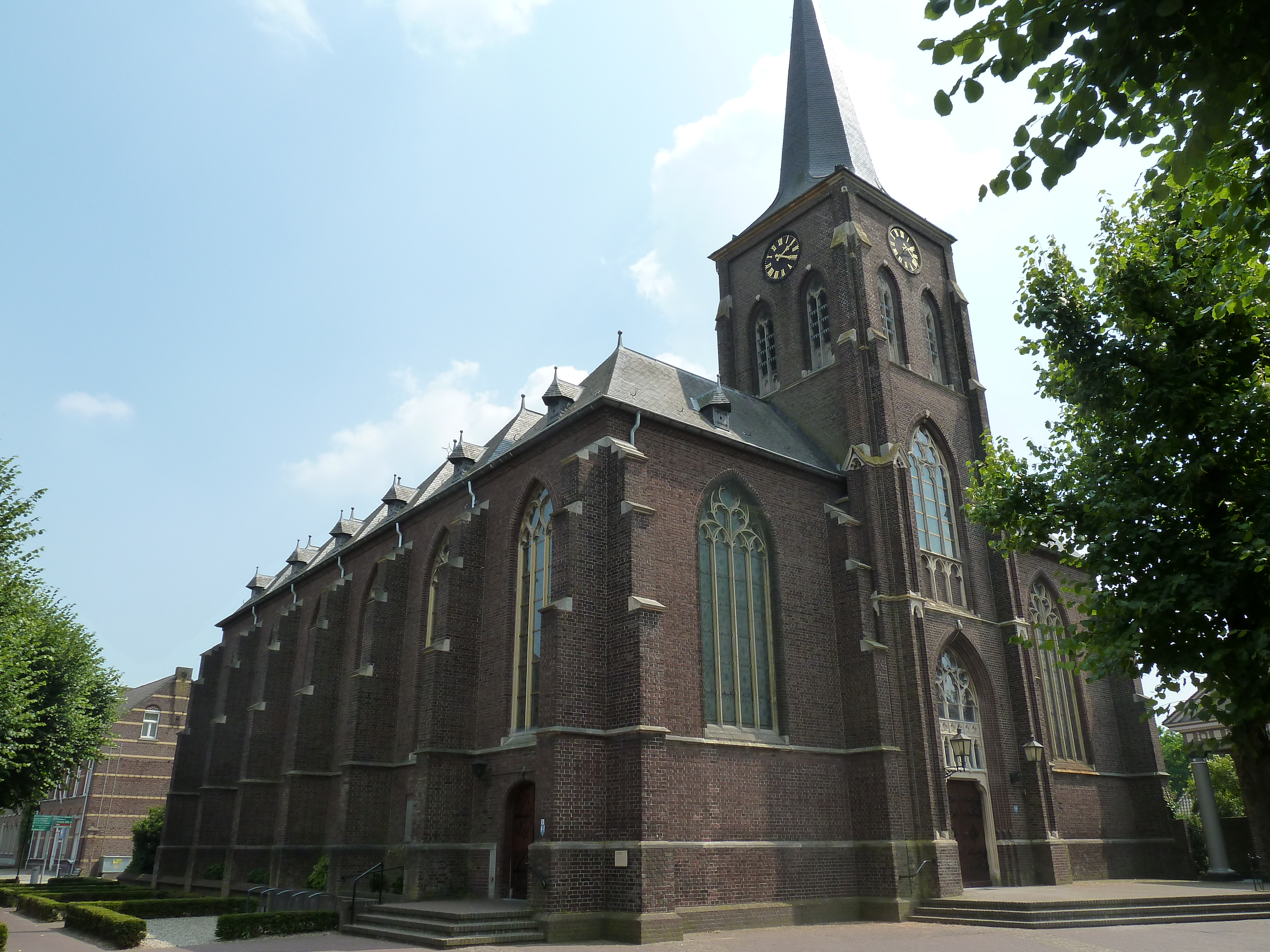
St Nicolaas Church

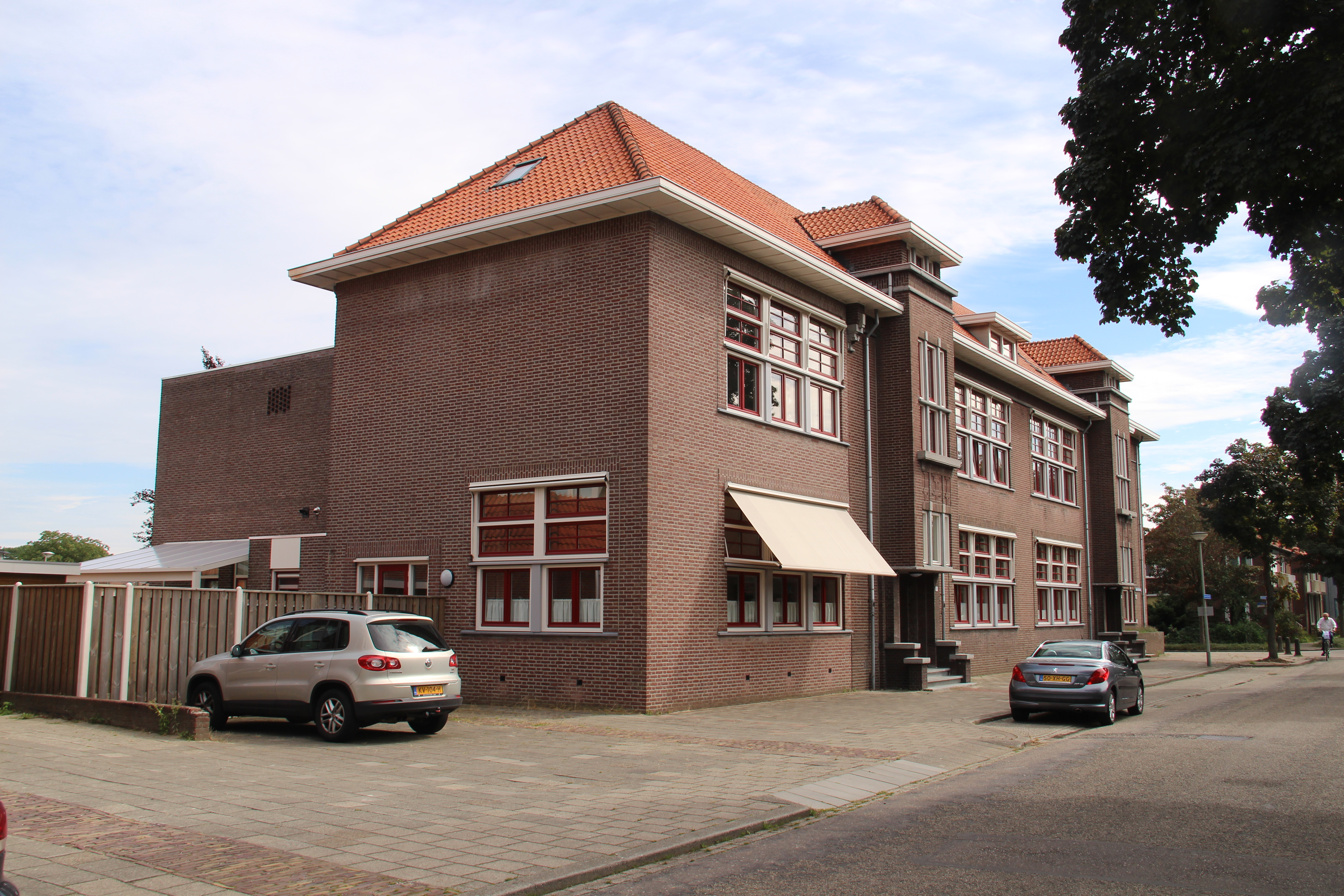
School in Heythuysen
