= 9/11 Family Steering Committee =

Organization of relatives of 9/11 victims

The 9/11 Family Steering Committee was an organization of twelve relatives of victims of the September 11 attacks in 2001 against the World Trade Center. Members of the Committee included the Jersey Girls. It was part of the 9/11 Truth Movement and was set up to monitor the work of the 9/11 Commission.

== History ==
The now-defunct group was an offshoot of the Coalition for an Independent 9/11 Commission, which advocated the creation of an independent commission to investigate the failures that made 9/11 possible. The coalition represented a wide array of 9/11 families' organizations, including Families of September 11, Sept. 11 Advocates (also known as "The Jersey Girls"), and Voices of September 11. Although the call for a commission was initially resisted by the Bush administration, the coalition eventually prevailed in the creation of the 9/11 Commission.

The Washington Post stated:

It is no exaggeration to say that yesterday's reorganization of the nation's intelligence structure would not have happened without Fetchet, Ashley and the 10 other self-appointed representatives of Sept. 11 victims' relatives who formed the Family Steering Committee.

"Would we be here except for those two? I don't think so," Sen. Joseph I. Lieberman (D-Conn.), one of the legislation's sponsors, said after thanking Fetchet and Ashley. "It was impossible for a member of Congress to face the family members and say they wouldn't do something."

"I agree," said Sen. Susan Collins (R-Maine), the co-sponsor. "They had the moral conviction."

The family members' public complaints pressured President Bush to drop his initial opposition to a Sept. 11 commission

== Monitoring of the 9/11 Commission ==
However, the Family Steering Committee was unsatisfied with the commission created and its mandate.

They stated:

While we believe that our concerns were acknowledged, we had also hoped that more of our questions and those of the American public would be fully addressed during the public hearings, or at the very least, discussed in the prepared staff statements," the statement read. "Yet today, many of our collective questions remain unanswered."

It further created a list of questions they argued was unanswered by the official commission.

On January 11, 2005, the committee made the following statement:

After three years of work toward making America more secure, the FSC is transitioning in order to address issues such as the release of the still embargoed 9/11 CIA and FAA reports; terrorist financing; immigration reform; the remaining recommendations of the 9/11 Commission; and other issues that continue to emerge. Although the FSC as a group will no longer exist, many of us will continue to work individually and through other 9/11 related groups for these causes.

The group ceased operations on January 11, 2005. Some of the research and advocacy of members of the Family Steering Committee is featured in the documentary "9/11: Press for Truth" premiered September 2006.

== Media coverage ==
- PBS NOW
- Scoop
- From The Wilderness
- Indymedia
- The Washington Post
- The Christian Science Monitor
- CBS News
- New York Daily News, written by the two members Kristen Breitweiser and Bill Harvey
- CNN
- The Washington Times
- Peter Lance
- The New York Times
- The Washington Post
- USA Today
- Zogby poll
- The Village Voice

== Members ==
The member list include all the Jersey Girls

- Carol Ashley
- Kristen Breitweiser
- Patty Casazza
- Beverly Eckert
- Mary Fetchet
- Monica Gabrielle
- Bill Harvey
- Mindy Kleinberg
- Carie Lemack
- Sally Regenhard
- Lorie Van Auken
- Robin Wiener
