= Terrorism in Bosnia and Herzegovina =

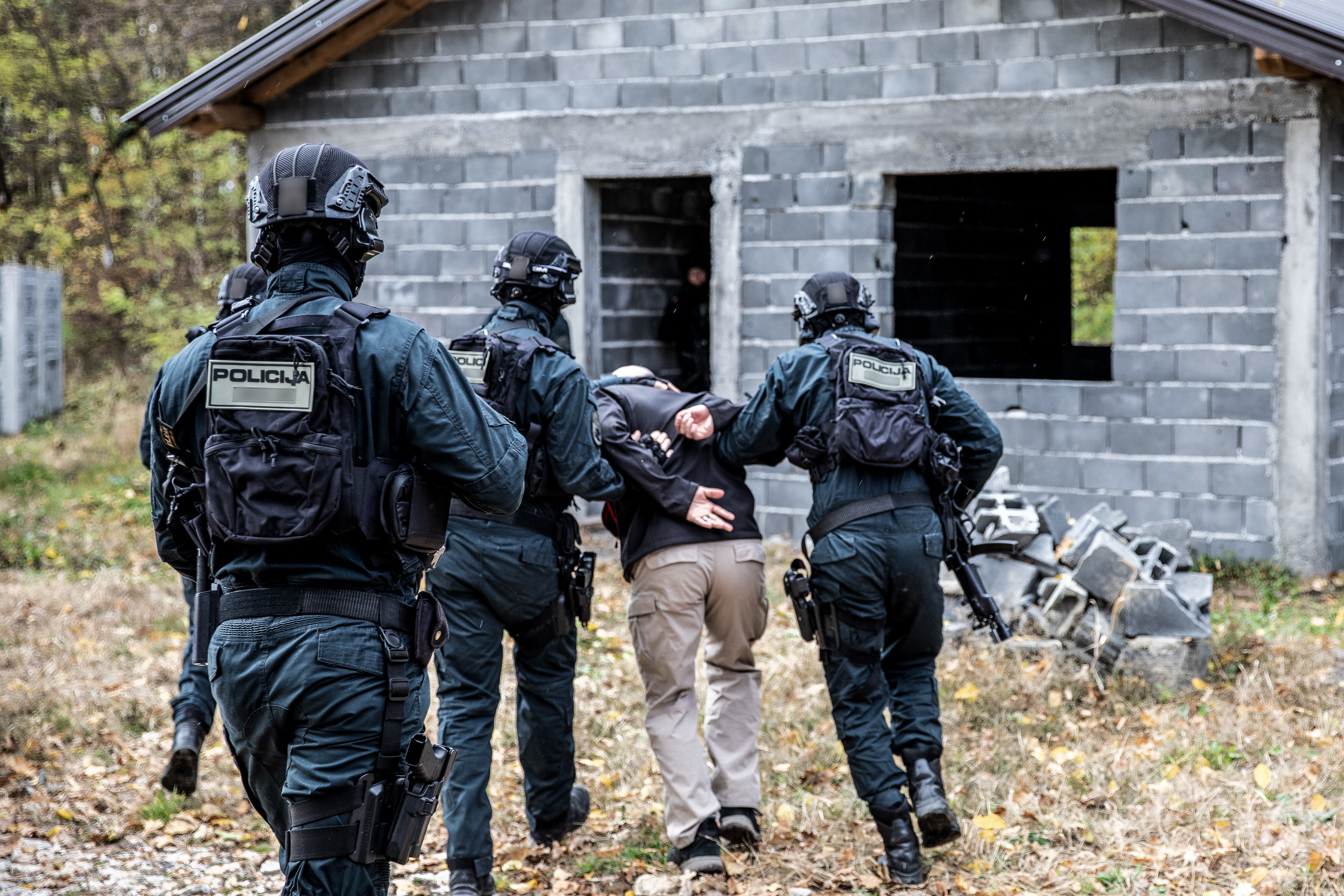
A Bosnian Special Forces unit conducting a counterterrorism drill in Tuzla, 2021

Bosnia and Herzegovina has experienced terrorism since the 1990s, namely related to regional armed conflicts and Islamic extremism. The United Nations (UN) found that the country had low levels of terrorist activity between the late-2010s and early-2020s. The UN report found that Bosnia and Herzegovina considers the following to be leading indicators: migration from destabilized regions; ultra-conservative religious groups, namely Islam; ethnic nationalism, and right-wing political movements.

== History ==
Since Bosnian independence in 1992, the nation initially dealt with terrorism due to the instability surrounding the Yugoslav Wars and Bosnian War. During this time, many nations in the region received an influx of foreign fighters to aid war efforts. The Bosnian mujahideen were primarily from Afghanistan and the Middle East, though Muslim volunteers arrived from all around the world, including Asia, North Africa and Europe. The foreign mujahideen were required to leave the region under the terms of the 1995 Dayton Agreement, but a contingent stayed. NATO-allied military intelligence agencies estimated that no more than 200 foreign-born militants actually stayed and lived in Bosnia in 2001.

=== Major attacks ===
- Mostar car bombing on 18 September 1997, a terrorist attack was organized by Ahmed Zuhair (Abu Handala), a Saudi mujahideen who had fought in Bosnia. According to Bosnian intelligence services, Handala was later arrested in Pakistan in 2002 and detained at Guantanamo.
- Mirsad Bektašević, a Bosniak from Montenegro who emigrated in 1994 to Sweden, was arrested on 19 October 2005 during a police raid in Sarajevo, together with a Danish citizen. A home-made suicide belt, 18 kilograms (40 lb) of factory-made explosives, timing devices, detonators and a Hi-8 videotape with footage demonstrating how to make a home-made bomb were found. A video (to be published following planned attacks) of the two arrested, in ski masks, surrounded by explosives and weapons, was found, in which they say that they will attack sites in Europe to punish nations with forces in Afghanistan and Iraq. They were suspected of planning a suicide attack against a Western embassy in Sarajevo.
- Bugojno bombing on 27 June 2010, a terrorist attack on Bugojno police station, in which IEDs exploded by the guard walls, killing one, seriously wounding one, and wounding several other policemen. The perpetrator Haris Čaušević, an ethnic Bosniak, was sentenced to 35 years. He has stated that he has no remorse.
- 2011 United States embassy attack in Sarajevo on 28 October 2011. A 23-year-old Bosniak from Serbia Mevlid Jašarević, fired on the U.S. embassy, resulting in one local policeman guarding the embassy being wounded in the arm, while the shooter was wounded by a police sniper. On 24 April 2012 Mevlid Jašarević was indicted by a federal grand jury in the D.C. on charges of attempted murder and other violations in connection with the attack on the embassy. A Bosnian court sentenced him on 6 December 2012 to 18 years in prison.
- 2015 Zvornik police station shooting on 27 April 2015. A man broke into the police station killing one policeman and wounding several others. The perpetrator, Nerdin Ibrić, an ethnic Bosniak, was killed inside the security compound by return fire.
- Husein Bosnić "Bilal", a Bosnian Muslim cleric and unofficial leader of the Salafist movement in Bosnia, was arrested in September 2014 and is currently on trial for recruiting ISIS fighters. In his various khutbas, he also advocated the "victory of Islam", promoting war and bloodshed. In 2012 he called for other Muslims to join the Jihad and to defend Islam, for which he was briefly arrested and soon released.

== Counterterrorism ==
Since the 2000s, Bosnia and Herzegovina has implemented extensive counterterrorism initiatives and laws to advance national security. In 2024, the nation adopted national anti-money laundering legislation to combat terrorist financing in the region.

== Notable people ==
- Bilal Bosnić (b. 1972), Bosnian Salafi leader, terrorist organizer
- Mevlid Jašarević, Bosnian Wahhabist, terrorist (2011 Sarajevo attack)

== See also ==
- Terrorism in Europe
- Terrorism in the United States
