= Croatia–Egypt relations =

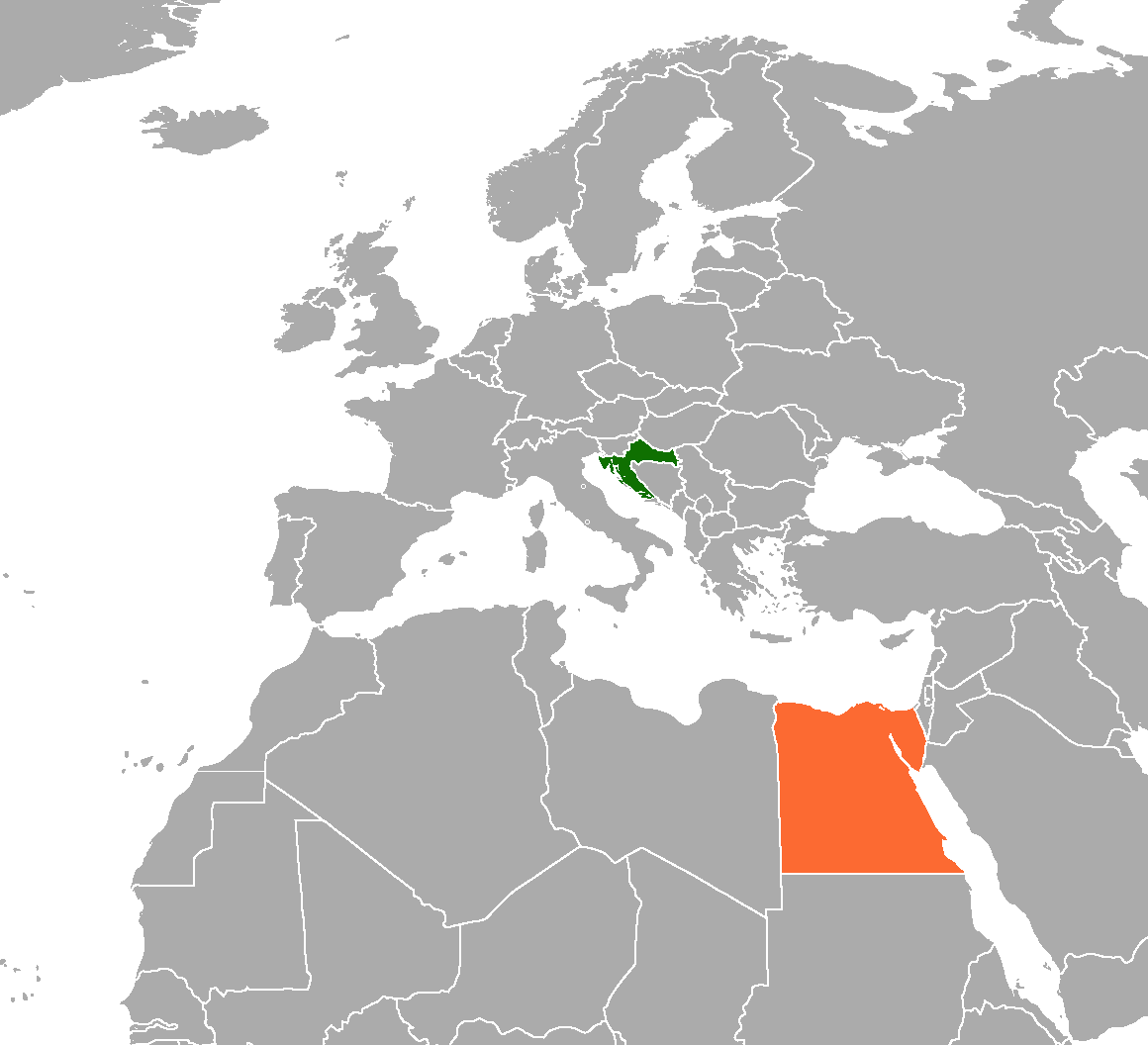

- Croatia: Egypt

Diplomatic mission
- Croatian Embassy, Cairo: Egyptian Embassy, Zagreb

Envoy
- Ambassador Tomislav Bošnjak: Ambassador; Ranija Mahmoud Elbanna

The foreign, diplomatic, economic, and political relations between Croatia and Egypt were established on 1 October 1992, following the independence of Croatia. Both countries are members of the Union for the Mediterranean. Egypt maintains an embassy in Zagreb while Croatia has an embassy in Cairo alongside an honorary consulate in Alexandria. Croatia is part of NATO and collaborates closely with Egypt as a Major non-NATO Ally on global security and counterterrorism.

The Croatian embassy in Cairo officially handles the countries of Bahrain, Ethiopia, Yemen, Jordan, Qatar, Kuwait, Lebanon, Oman, Saudi Arabia, Syria, Sudan and the United Arab Emirates, as well as Djibouti, Eritrea and Iraq in certain matters.

== History ==
Approximately 2,700 workers from what is now Croatia worked on the construction of the Suez Canal in Egypt. SFR Yugoslavia maintained warm relations with Egypt, especially through the Non-Aligned Movement. In the 1970s and 1980s, numerous Croatian companies had Egypt and other Arab countries as a capital export market, including INGRA, and the Croatian authorities have been trying to re-create those opportunities with various investment-related activities.

As an independent nation, Croatian officials have made a variety official visits to Egypt. President Hosni Mubarak was in Zagreb in October 2009, while Prime Minister Jadranka Kosor returned the visit in December 2010. Croatian companies made some inroads in the Egyptian market, notably including an oil exploration concession for INA in 2002 that became significant in 2007. In early 2011, many Croatian workers were evacuated from Egypt, including those of INA, as the 2011 Egyptian revolution started. In July 2011, the Croatian Government complied with the decision of the Council of the European Union to freeze Egyptian assets in connection to Mubarak and 18 connected persons.

Since the 2020s, the two nations have worked jointly to address bilateral counterterrorism efforts, economic cooperation, and the peaceful resolution of the regional Israeli conflict with Hamas in Gaza. Prime Minister Andrej Plenković visited Egypt in 2025 where he signed a commercial agreement between Port of Alexandria and the Port of Rijeka.

== Counterterrorism ==
Croatian, Egyptian, and U.S. intelligence agencies coordinated a joint response to the October 1995 Rijeka bombing, a suicide attack perpetrated by the Islamic terrorist organization al-Gama'a al-Islamiyya against Croatia. In September, the group's leader, Tal'at Fu'ad Qasim, was arrested in Croatia. He was interrogated by Croatian and U.S. authorities via extraordinary rendition and then executed by the Egyptian government.

In 2015, Croatian citizen Tomislav Salopek was abducted and decapitated in Egypt by the ISIL-affiliated Sinai Province Islamist militant organization. After a joint investigation, the Egyptian government identified Islamist organization Jamaat Ansar al-Sunna as a potential conspirator and executed Ahraf Ali al-Gharabali in relation to the killing. The kidnapping was in retaliation against Croatian military intervention in the war against the Islamic State alongside NATO. As a Major non-NATO Ally, Egypt collaborated extensively with Croatian intelligence agencies to advance bilateral counterterrorism measures.

== Diplomatic missions ==
- Croatia has an embassy in Cairo
- Egypt has an embassy in Zagreb

== See also ==
- Foreign relations of Croatia
- Foreign relations of Egypt
