= Mohammed al-Islambouli =

Egyptian Islamist

- محمد شوقي الإسلامبولي
- Born: 21 January 1957 (age 69); Minya, Egypt
- Military career
- Allegiance: Al-Qaeda al-Jama'a al-Islamiyya

Mohammed Showqi Al-Islambouli (Arabic: محمد شوقي الإسلامبولي) (born 21 January 1957) is an Egyptian militant leader in Al-Qaeda. A prominent figure in Islamic militancy, he organized early Egyptian mujahideen networks during the Soviet–Afghan War. After establishing weapon and personnel smuggling networks through Pakistan in the 1980s, he held leadership positions in various militant organizations including Al-Jama'a al-Islamiyya. Following a brief return to Egypt in 2011 and subsequent release from detention in 2012, he emerged as the leader of the Khorasan Group, an al-Qaeda affiliate operating during the Syrian Civil War alongside the Nusra Front.

Mohammed is the younger brother of Khalid al-Islambouli, who assassinated Egyptian President Anwar Sadat in 1981.

== Militancy ==
Mohammed Showqi Al-Islambouli was born on January 21, 1957, in Mina, Egypt. He is the younger brother of Khalid al-Islambouli, who assassinated Egyptian President Anwar Sadat in 1981.

Islambouli organised the first teams of Egyptian mujahideen who joined the Afghan Arabs after the Soviet invasion of Afghanistan. By 1983, he had established a network smuggling people and weapons through Karachi, Pakistan and Egypt that still functioned by the dawn of the war on terror in 2001.

In late May 1995, Hassan al-Turabi met with al-Qaida deputy leader Ayman al-Zawahiri to discuss the future of the Vanguards of Conquest; now to operate solely out of Egypt. al-Zawahiri and Mustafa Hamza organised a meeting in Ferney-Voltaire on the French-Swiss border, attended by a colleague of Tal'at Fu'ad Qasim, an associate of Showky Al-Islambouli and the son of Said Ramadan. The group decided to focus their efforts on Addis Ababa, and that their veteran members would come together under the leadership of Islambouli.

Al-Islambouli came close to assassinating the Egyptian President Hosni Mubarak on 22 June 1995 on the way from Addis Ababa International Airport to an African summit in the city. Al-Islambouli and his associates opened fire on the armor-plated limousine, destroying most of the escort vehicles. However, Mubarak was saved by the skills of his chauffeur, who U-turned the damaged limousine and raced back to the airport where the presidential plane was waiting with running engines.

Over the winter of 1996–97, Al-Islambouli was commanding a team of al-Gama'a al-Islamiyya members, and allocated them to travel to Somalia to bolster the forces of the Islamic Liberation Party.

Al-Islambouli returned to Egypt in May 2011. He was arrested upon arrival at Cairo International Airport and was retried on terrorism charges. An Egyptian military court in Cairo ordered his release on health grounds in February 2012.

=== Syria ===
By October 2014, Al-Islambouli was reported to be leading the Khorasan Group (KG), a group of 40 to 60 key al-Qaida members who came to Syria during the Syria Civil War along with 100 support staff. KG embedded with the Nusra Front, which provided KG with logistical support and sanctuary.
