= Luxor massacre =

1997 terrorist attack in Egypt

Coordinates: 25°44′18″N 32°36′23″E

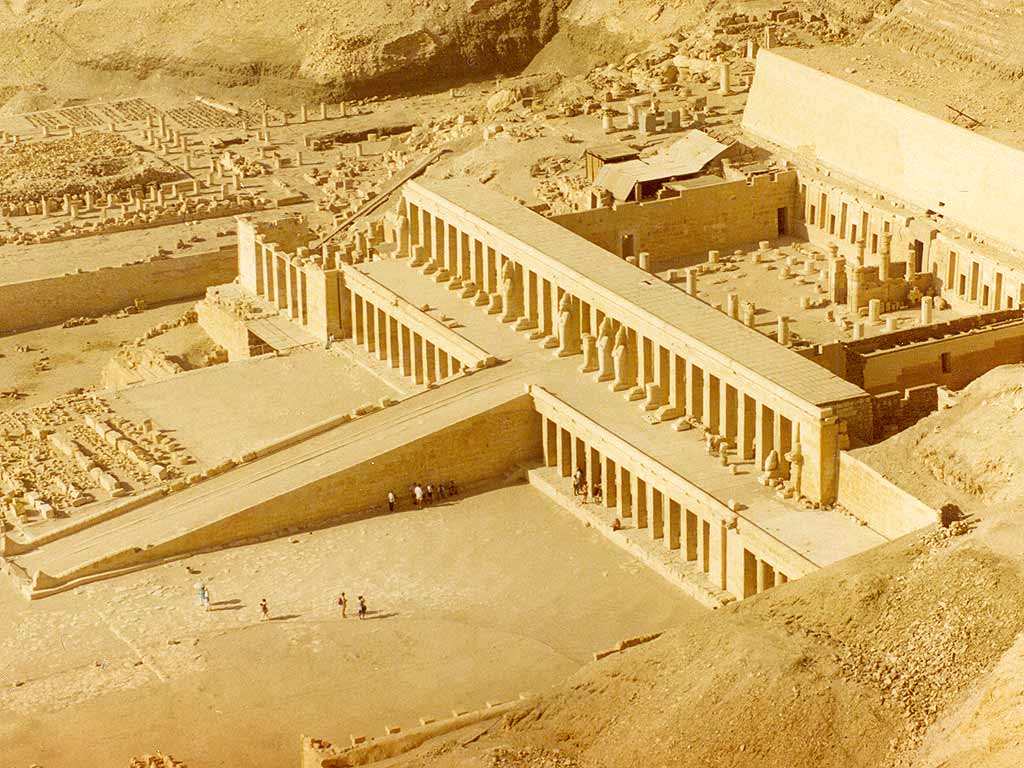
- The Mortuary Temple of Hatshepsut, where the attack took place
- Location: Dayr al-Bahri, Egypt
- Date: 17 November 1997; 28 years ago 8:45 a.m. – 9:30 a.m. (UTC+02:00)
- Target: Tourists
- Attack type: Mass shooting
- Weapons: Automatic firearms, knives, machetes
- Deaths: 62 (58 tourists, 4 Egyptians)
- Perpetrator: Al-Jama'a al-Islamiyya
- Assailant: 6 militants (later committed suicide)
- Motive: Terrorism

The Luxor massacre was a terrorist attack that occurred on 17 November 1997 in Egypt. It was perpetrated by al-Jama'a al-Islamiyya and resulted in the deaths of 62 people, most of whom were tourists. It took place at Dayr al-Bahri, an archaeological site located across the Nile from the city of Luxor.

== Attack ==
In the mid-morning of 17 November, six gunmen killed 58 foreign nationals and four Egyptians. The assailants were armed with knives and automatic firearms and disguised as members of the security forces. They descended on the Mortuary Temple of Hatshepsut at around 08:45. They killed two armed guards at the site. With the tourists trapped inside the temple, the killing went on systematically for 45 minutes, during which many bodies, especially of women, were mutilated with machetes. The body of an elderly Japanese man was also found mutilated. A leaflet was discovered stuffed into his body that read "no to tourists in Egypt" and was signed "Omar Abdul Rahman's Squadron of Havoc and Destruction—the Gama'a al-Islamiyya, the Group".

The dead included a five-year-old British child, Shaunnah Turner, Turner's mother and grandmother and four Japanese couples on honeymoon. There were 26 survivors.

The attackers then hijacked a bus, but ran into a checkpoint of armed Egyptian National Police and military forces. One of the terrorists was wounded in the subsequent shootout and the rest fled into the hills where their bodies were found in a cave, apparently having committed suicide together.

One or more al-Jama'a al-Islamiyya leaflets were found calling for the release of Omar Abdel-Rahman from a U.S. prison, stating that the attack had been carried out as a gesture to exiled leader Mustafa Hamza, or declaring: "We shall take revenge for our brothers who have died on the gallows. The depths of the earth are better for us than the surface since we have seen our brothers squatting in their prisons, and our brothers and families tortured in their jails".

== Casualties ==
Most of the victims were foreign tourists. Most of the casualties were from Switzerland, with 36 of its citizens killed. The youngest victim was a five-year-old British child.

Nationality	Number of victims
Swiss	36
Japanese	10
British	6
German	4
Egyptian	4
Colombian	2
Bulgarian	1
French	1

== Responsibility ==
The attack was thought to have been instigated by exiled leaders of al-Jama'a al-Islamiyya, an organization, attempting to undermine the organization's July 1997 "Nonviolence Initiative", to devastate the Egyptian economy and provoke the government into repression that would strengthen support for anti-government forces. However, the attack led to internal divisions among the militants, and resulted in the declaration of a ceasefire. In June 2013, the group denied that it was involved in the massacre.

== Reaction ==
The attack took place an hour before the state visit of Queen Beatrix of the Netherlands and Prince-Consort Claus.

Following the attack, President Hosni Mubarak replaced interior minister General Hassan Al Alfi with General Habib el-Adly. The Swiss Federal Police "later determined that Osama bin Laden had financed the operation".

The tourist industry in Egypt, and particularly in Luxor, was seriously affected by the resultant slump in visitor numbers. Tourism remained depressed for years, a problem worsened by the September 11 attacks in the United States in 2001, the 2005 Sharm El Sheikh bombings, and the 2006 Dahab bombings.

The massacre marked a decisive drop in terrorists' fortunes in Egypt by turning public opinion overwhelmingly against them. Terrorist attacks declined dramatically following the backlash from the massacre. Organizers and supporters of the attack quickly realized that the strike had been a massive miscalculation and reacted with denials of involvement. The day after the attack, al-Jama'a al-Islamiyya leader Refa'i Ahmed Taha claimed the attackers intended only to take the tourists hostage, despite the immediate and systematic nature of the slaughter. Others denied involvement completely, falsely attributing the killings to various groups. Sheikh Omar Abdel-Rahman blamed Israel for the killings, and Ayman Zawahiri maintained they were the work of the Egyptian police.

== See also ==
- Terrorism in Egypt
- List of massacres in Egypt
