= Killing of Tomislav Salopek =

Kidnapping by ISIL of Croatian expatriate worker

Kidnapping of Tomislav Salopek
- Part of Islamic State beheadings
- Salopek and a masked militant alongside a Black Standard from 2015 IS-SP propaganda video.
- Date: July 22, 2015; 11 years ago
- Location: Abduction: Cairo, Egypt Confinement: Sinai Peninsula
- Type: Kidnapping, abduction
- Motive: Retaliation against Croatian military intervention in the War against the Islamic State
- Perpetrator: Islamic State – Sinai Province
- Missing: 1
- Accused: Ahraf Ali al-Gharabali (Jamaat Ansar al-Sunna)

On 22 July 2015, Croatian expatriate worker Tomislav Salopek was kidnapped and abducted by the Islamic State – Sinai Province (IS-SP). The militant group purported to have detained him in Egypt, later claiming to have murdered him by decapitation. The group claimed the attack was in retaliation against Croatian military intervention in the war against the Islamic State alongside NATO. Salopek is considered to be the first Croatian citizen to be murdered by the Islamic State of Iraq and the Levant (ISIL).

Croatian and Egyptian authorities led a 22-day international rescue mission to extract Salopek during his abduction. On 12 August 2015 IS-SP released a still image purporting to show Salopek's decapitated body, marking the first hostage execution in Egypt. An investigation followed wherin Egypt identified Islamist organization Jamaat Ansar al-Sunna as a potential conspirator and executed Ahraf Ali al-Gharabali in relation to the killing.

== Biography ==
Tomislav Salopek
- Born: Tomislav Salopek; 2 June 1984; Vrpolje, Croatia
- Disappeared: 22 July 2015; Cairo, Egypt
- Died: c. 12 August 2015 (aged 31); Sinai Peninsula, Egypt
- Cause of death: Decapitation
- Occupation: Geographic topographer

Tomislav Salopek (2 June 1984 - c. 12 August 2015) was a Croatian expatriate worker and geographic topographer born in Vrpolje, a small town in Croatia near the border with Bosnia and Herzegovina. He graduated from the Secondary Geodetic Technical School and was a geodetic technician. He was employed at the Zagreb Geophysics Institute. In addition to Croatia, he worked in Egypt, Syria, Libya, Iraq and Tunisia. He had a wife, Nataša, and two children. Salopek previously survived a near-kidnapping in Syria.

== Kidnapping ==
Salopek was working for Compagnie Générale de Géophysique (CGG) at the time when was kidnapped on 22 July 2015, while he was on his way to CGG's business site near Cairo. An armed group intercepted Salopek and seized his vehicle. The group drove off with him in an unknown direction.

Salopek's whereabouts were unknown for the following two weeks. On 5 August 2015, a video titled A Message to the Egyptian Government was uploaded to several video services in which Wilayat Sinai is seen detaining a man who self-identified as Tomislav Salopek. Salopek was kneeling while a masked man with a knife in his hand stood beside him. He was forced to read a note stating that ISIL demands Egyptian president Abdel Fattah el-Sisi to release "Muslim women" from Egyptian prisons, warning that he will be executed within 48 hours if their demands are not met.

A CGG spokesman later stated that the kidnappers had contacted the company via e-mail, after first contacting Salopek's wife, and demanded tens of millions of euros for Salopek's release. The company repeatedly urged Salopek's captors to give them confirmation that he was still alive. It is suspected that Salopek was first kidnapped by one group that asked CGG for ransom, and that they eventually, for unknown reasons, handed him over to ISIL.

== Rescue mission ==
The Croatian government immediately set off a diplomatic initiative in cooperation with the Egyptian Ministry of Foreign Affairs to extract Salopek during his abduction. Croatian Foreign Minister Vesna Pusić later stated that many other countries also helped, including two of Croatia's close allies, the United States and Germany, as well as France, the United Kingdom and fellow European Union member states. Russia and Serbia offered their support. Simultaneously with Salopek's kidnapping, the opening of the New Suez Canal was to take place. President of France François Hollande stated that a mission to locate Salopek was underway in a speech at the canal's opening ceremony.

When the footage was published, Vesna Pusić, Salopek's wife Nataša, and agents of the Croatian Secret Service traveled to Cairo, where Pusić met with her Egyptian colleague Sameh Shoukry. Croatian President Kolinda Grabar-Kitarović, a former NATO official, spoke with Egyptian President Sisi. The president of the main organization of Muslims in Croatia, Aziz Effendi Hasanović, sent a "call for help to the Arab Republic of Egypt to save an innocent life". He contacted, among others, Egyptian government officials and the Grand Mufti of Egypt, Shawki Allam.

In the next few days, four Egyptian security services in cooperation with the Egyptian army and the police launched a major rescue operation. The entire operation was personally led by the Egyptian Interior Minister Magdy Abdel Ghafar. Security forces searched a series of terrorist strongholds in the cities of Sheikh Zuweid, Rafah and Arish, as well as locations the Egypt-Libya and Gaza–Egypt borders.

== Death ==
On 12 August 2015, ISIL supporters uploaded a photograph purporting to show the decapitated body of Salopek to social media platforms. Buried in the sand next to the body was the Black Standard used by the militant group. They declared that his execution was in retaliation for Croatia's participation in the international coalition against ISIL. Croatia, an EU and NATO member as well as a noted peacekeeping force, was supplying small arms to governmental anti-ISIL forces in the Levant. Immediately after the image's release, Croatian President Grabar-Kitarović canceled all her activities for the day and held an emergency press briefing.

== Aftermath ==
=== Investigation ===
Egyptian intelligence services stated that Salopek was kidnapped by Iraqi Islamist organization Jamaat Ansar al-Sunna and taken to Libya, where they subsequently killed him. In November 2015, Egyptian authorities proclaimed that they eliminated a suspect of Salopek's murder Ahraf Ali al-Gharabali. Salopek's body was never found nor returned to the family.

=== Military response ===
Joining the Global Coalition against ISIL in 2014, Croatia significantly expanded military operations against the Islamic State after the kidnapping in 2015. Two years later in 2017, the Croatian Armed Forces joined U.S. Armed Forces in Iraq and Kuwait for Operation Inherent Resolve for nearly a decade to further repel ISIL. Croatia redeployed soldiers to Iraq for non-combat Iraqi counterterrorism support in 2024. Two years later, in 2026, the Ministry of Foreign Affairs confirmed the coalition's intent to expand its military remit to include ISIL in sub-Saharan Africa and ISIL within Central Asia.

== Reactions ==
=== Domestic ===
Croatian President Grabar-Kitarović said: "as long as there is one glimmer of hope and one ounce of a chance that our Tomislav is still alive we will continue working, searching and trying to save his life. I would like to express gratitude to all those who are working on this case. First of all to the Croatian institutions and second, to all friendly countries and agencies, including many friends from Arab countries who are trying to save Tomislav's life." Prime Minister Zoran Milanović called an emergency press conference over the execution, starting that he "[could not] 100% be certain" of the photo's authenticity, but that "it [looked] horrific."

=== International ===
Following the image's publication, many state officials condemned Salopek's execution:

- United States: State Department issued a statement in which they wrote: "Our thoughts are with Mr. Salopek's family and friends and Croatian people. If this news is confirmed, the murder of Mr. Salopek will be staggering crime that is at the core of ISIL's extremist agenda. We strongly condemn the brutality towards innocent victims throughout the Middle East. United States stand shoulder to shoulder with the Croatian people and all our partners in the fight against terrorism."
- United Kingdom: British Foreign Secretary Philip Hammond stated: "If these reports are accurate I strongly condemn the alleged brutal murder of Croatian citizen Tomislav Salopek by ISIL in Egypt. My thoughts are with his family and colleagues and with the Croatian people. Britain will stand by Egypt and Croatia in continuing opposition to this inhumane type of terrorism."
- Germany: The German Foreign Ministry also condemned this crime in its statement: "This heinous act shows once again that the fanatical ideology of ISIS threats to all of us. Germany will in cooperation with its international partners continue to do everything possible to suppress ISIS, not only militarily, but above all politically."
- France: French Foreign Minister Laurent Fabius stated: "I'm terrified about the news that the terrorist group announced that it murdered Croatian hostage. If confirmed this despicable murder will confirm once more cowardly and barbaric nature of this terrorist organization. I express my solidarity with the Croatian government and the people as well as with the family of Mr. Salopek. France condemns all forms of terrorism and stand with Croatia and Egypt in fight against this scourge."
- Spain: Spain expressed full solidarity to Croatia and Egypt and offered its condolences to Salopek's family.

== See also ==
- Croatia–Egypt relations
- David Haines, resided in Croatia before being kidnapped by ISIL
- 1993 Hidroelektra workers massacre
- 1995 Rijeka bombing
