= Tamesguida ambush =

Ambush of Tamesguida
- Part of Algerian Civil War
| Date | 1 September 1992 |
| Location | Tamesguida, Medea, Algeria |
| Result | Algerian victory |

Belligerents
| Algeria | Armed Islamic Group of Algeria: Islamic Armed Movement; Movement for the Islamic State (MEI); Group of Moh Leveilley |

Commanders and leaders
| Unknown | Abdelkader Chebouti; Mensouri Meliani; Abdelhak Layada; Djafer al-Afghani; Moh Leveilley †; Noureddine Bouafra † |

Units involved
| Algerian Security Forces | Unknown |

Strength
| Unknown | 40 |

Casualties and losses
| Unknown | 2 killed 2 captured (prior to the ambush) |

The Ambush of Tamesguida occurred on September 1 1992, where Algerian Security Forces ambushed an Islamist meeting in Tamesguida during unity talks that preceded the formation of the Armed Islamic Group of Algeria (GIA).

== Context ==
On 1 September 1992, several Islamist factions sought to unify their groups, deciding to meet in the town of Tamesguida in Médéa province. There were three main groups: the group of Moh Leveilley, also known as Muhammad Allal, based in Algiers, Blida, Boufarik and Médéa; the Movement for an Islamic State led by Mensour Miliani, mainly composed of Afghan Arabs; and the Islamic Armed Movement being led by Abdelkader Chebouti. Initial discussions show the groups were going to unite under Abdelkader Chebouti and Abdelhak Layada as co-emirs. Other sources suggest it was only Abdelkader Chebouti, with Abdelhak not being mentioned.

Meanwhile, Algerian security forces arrested two FIS members sent by Ashour Touati, one of the FIS leaders; by interrogating these, the Algerian government determined the location of the meeting. Moh Leveilley received a warning but ignored it, insisting they have the meeting at the assigned location. The meeting lasted an hour before being interrupted; there were forty Islamist militants attending it.

== Ambush ==
Algerian security forces launched a surprise assault on the gathering, forcing eight militants and Djafer al-Afghani (also known as Mourad Si Ahmed) to engage in a firefight with the security forces. Moh Leveilley's senior aide emerged with a machine gun and exchanged fire with the security forces but was shot dead. With a defensive advantage, security forces refused to storm the house out of fear of being ambushed by Djafer and the eight other militants, instead throwing rocks at the roof of the house they were trapped in. Eventually the eight members managed to escape out of the house with Djafer. Meanwhile, Moh Leveilley escaped toward the mountains but was found by security forces, who used helicopters and a loudspeaker, asking Moh to surrender. Moh refused and was subsequently killed by the security forces.
