= Khorasan group =

Islamic group

Khorasan Group
- خراسان (in Arabic)
- The Shahada flag commonly used by al-Qaeda, the parent organization of Khorasan
- Leaders: Mohammed Islambouli (2013–present); Muhsin al-Fadhli † (2013–15); Sanafi al-Nasr † (2015); Abu Khayr al-Masri † (al-Qaeda Deputy leader)
- Dates active: March 2013 – 27 February 2018
- Headquarters: Bawabiyah, Aleppo Governorate, Syria (2013–2014); Salqin, Idlib, Syria (2014–2015); Idlib, Idlib Governorate, Syria (March 2015 – February 2017)
- Active regions: Northwestern Syria
- Ideology: Sunni Islamism; Jihadism; Qutbism
- Size: 50
- Part of: al-Qaeda: al-Nusra Front (2012–2017)
- Wars: the Syrian Civil War and the Global War on Terrorism

The Khorasan group, sometimes known simply as Khorasan, was an alleged group of senior al-Qaeda members operating in Syria. The group was reported to consist of a small number of fighters who are all on terrorist watchlists, and coordinated with al-Nusra Front, al-Qaeda's official affiliate in Syria. At an intelligence gathering in Washington, D.C., on 18 September 2014, Director of National Intelligence James Clapper stated that "in terms of threat to the homeland, Khorasan may pose as much of a danger as ISIS."

The term first appeared in news media in September 2014, although the United States had reportedly been keeping track of the group for two years. By early November 2014, the term had disappeared from political rhetoric. Commentators have stated that the threat the Khorasan Group represented was exaggerated to generate public support for American intervention in Syria, and some have questioned whether the group even exists as a distinct entity.

On 28 May 2015, al-Nusra Front leader Abu Mohammed al-Julani explicitly denied the existence of the supposed Khorasan group. The al-Nusra Front had received specific orders since at least early 2015 from al-Qaeda leader Ayman al-Zawahiri to cease any activities related to attacking Western targets.

In July 2015, both Muhsin al-Fadhli, said to be the operational leader of the group, and chief bombmaker David Drugeon, were killed by 2 US airstrikes. After their deaths, FBI Director James Comey stated that the Khorasan group had become diminished, and that ISIL was now a bigger threat to the US.

On 15 October 2015, a Coalition airstrike in northwest Syria killed Abdul Mohsen Adballah Ibrahim al Charekh (a.k.a. Sanafi al-Nasr), who was then the highest ranking leader of the Khorasan group. He was the deputy leader of Khorasan before Muhsin al-Fadhli's death.

Beginning in January 2017, it was reported that the US no longer referred to Khorasan fighters specifically, and that US officials no longer attempted to distinguish between Khorasan and al-Nusra Front militants, instead, labeling them all collectively as "al-Qaeda". Around this time, the US significantly increased the number of its airstrikes against al-Nusra Front and other al-Qaeda-affiliated targets. At this point, the Khorasan group was effectively wiped out, with a large majority of its members killed after repeated US airstrikes. On 27 February 2018, the remnants of the Khorasan group and other al-Qaeda loyalists defected from Hay'at Tahrir al-Sham (the successor to al-Nusra) and founded Hurras al-Din, which became al-Qaeda's official affiliate in Syria.

== Name ==
Khorasan refers to a region including parts of Uzbekistan, Afghanistan, Turkmenistan, and Iran. The U.S. intelligence community coined the term "Khorasan group" in reference to the Khorasan Shura, the leadership council within al-Qaeda believed to have been hiding in the Afghanistan-Pakistan area.

The United States Central Command (CENTCOM) described the Khorasan Group as a "network of Nusrah Front and al-Qa'ida core extremists who share a history of training operatives, facilitating fighters and money, and planning attacks against U.S. and Western targets." Patrick Ryder of CENTCOM defined the Khorasan Group "as a network of veteran al-Qaeda operations who were plotting external attacks against the United States and our allies." The Long War Journal described the Khorasan Group as "a collection of al-Qaeda operatives sent to Syria to perform various functions, including laying the groundwork for external operations against the West."

== Membership ==
According to a source close to Nusra Front leadership, the Khorasan Group (KG) numbered several dozen experienced jihadists who had come from Afghanistan to Syria during the Syrian Civil War. The presence of these veterans was symbolic, as they were all wanted terrorists by the United States and directly followed al-Qaeda leadership. A U.S. intelligence source indicated the group numbered about 50 members. Members of the group were said to have worked with bomb-makers from Yemen to target civilian aircraft heading to the United States.

The group found sanctuary in Idlib Province and the surrounding areas.

KG militants came from both the Nusra Front and the Islamic State. The cadre in the Khorasan Group was differentiated from the broader group of senior al-Qaeda leaders and operatives in Syria, such as Abu Firas al-Suri, Ahmed Refai Taha, and Ahmad Salama Mabruk.

According to US officials, the organization was led by Mohammed Islambouli, whose brother Khalid Islambouli assassinated Egyptian President Anwar Sadat in 1981. Another Khorasan Group member, Abu Yusuf Al-Turki, was reported to have been killed on 23 September 2014 by US airstrikes in Syria.

Notable members included:

Name	Citizenship	Details	Sources
Mohammed al-Islambouli	Egyptian	Senior al-Qaeda figure, and top Khorasan Group leader. Nearly assassinated Egyptian President Hosni Mubarak in 1995. Led the group to Syria in 2013.	
Sanafi al-Nasr	Saudi	Senior al-Qaeda financial official, including a stint as al-Qaeda's chief financial officer in 2012. Played role in Khorasan Group's finances and facilitating routes for recruits to travel from Pakistan to Syria via Turkey. He also moved funds from the Persian Gulf into Iraq, then to al-Qaeda leaders.	
Muhsin al-Fadhli	Kuwaiti	Prominent al-Qaeda member who went to Iran after the US invasion of Afghanistan. In charge of KG's external operations.	
David Drugeon	French	Chief bombmaker.	
Abu Yusuf Al-Turki	Turkish	Senior KG figure.	

There are indications that some members of the Khorasan Group (including Abu Yusuf Al-Turki) were part of an elite sniper subunit of the al-Nusra Front that was known as the "Wolf Group".

== History ==
Around March 2013, al-Qaeda leader Ayman al-Zawahiri deployed the Khorasan Group to Syria, in order to mediate the growing conflict between the Islamic State and al-Nusra Front, and also to plan for attacks on the West. The organization was led by Mohammed al-Islambouli, and consisted of around 50 militants, with an additional 100 support staff. The US military's Joint Special Operations Command felt that the Khorasan Group was serious enough of a threat to put together a target list in June 2014, but they didn't attack at the time since the US wasn't ready yet to launch airstrikes in Iraq or Syria. The Khorasan Group's existence was first publicly acknowledged in mid-September 2014, when U.S. Director of national Intelligence James Clapper indicated it was operating in Syria and Iraq and was actively planning external operations against the West. According to U.S. officials, bombmakers in KG were in the final stages of planning terrorist attacks against the United States, with technical help from Ibrahim al-Asiri, al-Qaeda's master bombmaker in Yemen. According to CNN, the U.S. intelligence community had reportedly recently discovered KG plots against the United States, potentially involving a "a bomb made of a nonmetallic device like a toothpaste container or clothes dipped in explosive material" to beat airport security.

Later statements by officials indicated that "there were no known targets or attacks expected in the next few weeks" at the time the US began bombing in Syria. On 5 October 2014, FBI director James Comey stated, "I can't sit here and tell you whether their plan is tomorrow or three weeks or three months from now", but that "we have to act as if it's coming tomorrow."

=== American-led intervention ===
As part of the broader American-led intervention in Syria targeting al-Qaeda and ISIS, the U.S. began conducting preemptive airstrikes against targets it said were associated with the Khorasan Group on 22 September 2014. By 24 March 2015, 17 Khorasan figures had reportedly been killed by U.S. airstrikes since the beginning of the air campaign.

After the death of Muhsin al-Fadli was announced on 22 July 2015, FBI Director James Comey stated that Khorasan had become "diminished", and that ISIS had become a greater threat to the U.S. than al-Qaeda or the Khorasan group.

Date	Location	Details	Source
23 September 2014	West of Aleppo	According to the U.S., it conducted eight airstrikes against the group's training camps, command and control facilities, and other sites in the area west of Aleppo, Syria. The attacks were ineffective and killed only one or two militants, largely because the members of the group had been warned in advance.	
6 November 2014	Idlib and Aleppo provinces	U.S. claimed to bomb KG targets. According local activists and the Syrian Observatory for Human Rights, Ahrar ash-Sham and Nusra Front targets were also hit. KG's chief bombmaker David Drugeon was later believed to have been killed in the attack, but subsequent reports indicated he was only wounded.	
13 November 2014		U.S. bombed KG targets.	
19 November 2014	Near Harem, Syria	U.S. conducted airstrike on a storage facility associated with the group.	
1 December 2014	Near Aleppo	U.S. airstrike	
20 May 2015	Idlib Province	U.S. conducted 2 airstrikes on Khorasan targets, killing Algerian al-Qaeda operative Said Arif, the military chief of Jund al-Aqsa.	
1 July 2015	Near Aleppo	U.S. airstrike kills Drugeon. His death was not reported until 11 September.	
8 July 2015	Near Sarmada, Syria	U.S. airstrike kills Muhsin al-Fadhli while traveling in a vehicle.	
15 October 2015	Northwest Syria	U.S. airstrike kills Sanafi al-Nasr, formerly al-Qaeda's chief financial officer and the highest-ranking member of the Khorasan Group. According to the U.S. he was the fifth senior Khorasan Group leader killed by U.S. airstrikes in the previous 4 months.	

=== Other activity ===
On 18 November 2014, the Syrian Army ambushed a group of Khorasan militants in the countryside of Latakia in a separate operation. Eleven members of the group were killed and another 13 were wounded or captured. The Kazakh and Chechen field commanders of the unit, along with Burmese and Saudi jihadists, were among the dead. The attack also left seven al-Nusra Front fighters dead.

On 3 April 2016, Abu Firas al Suri, al-Nusra's spokesman, and seen as a leading figure within the Khorasan group, was killed in a US airstrike. The airstrike also killed al-Suri's son and 20 other al-Nusra and Jund al-Aqsa militants. Later in the same week, a second airstrike killed several Khorasan militants, including Rifai Ahmed Taha Musa, who attempted to unite Ahrar ash-Sham with al-Nusra Front in January 2016.

On 12 January 2017, a US airstrike near Saraqib killed al-Nusra leaders Abd al-Jalil al-Muslimi, Abu Amas al-Masri, and Abu Ikrimah al-Tunsi, along with 10 or 15 other al-Nusra fighters. This came after a marked increase in US airstrikes on al-Nusra Front beginning in January 2017, at which time the US reportedly dropped the "Khorasan group" label and began referring to all al-Qaeda linked targeted as simply "al-Qaeda".

On 28 January 2017, al-Nusra Front merged with several other Islamist groups to become Hay'at Tahrir al-Sham (HTS), which was the organization's second rebranding. This move further deepened the split between the HTS leaders and al-Qaeda's leadership, a schism that had been growing since al-Nusra's first rebranding effort back in 2016, and it led to multiple high-profile al-Qaeda hardliners leaving the organization, including Sami al-Oraydi and Abu Hajar a-Shami. On 26 February, a US airstrike in Al-Mastoumeh, Idlib Province, killed Abu Khayr al-Masri, who was the deputy leader of al-Qaeda. He had been dispatched to Syria by al-Qaeda leader Ayman al-Zawahiri, and was nested in the Khorasan group. The US airstrike also killed another Tahrir al-Sham militant, who was traveling in the same car. By this point, the ranks of the Khorasan Group had effectively been decimated, after a few years of repeated US airstrikes, which had wiped out most of its membership.

On 9 October 2017, 5 days after al-Qaeda leader Ayman al-Zawahiri had denounced HTS in a speech (without naming them), Abu Julaybib led 300 al-Qaeda loyalists to split off and form Ansar al-Furqan. A full split between HTS and al-Qaeda ensued over the next two months, in which HTS cracked down on dissent from al-Qaeda loyalists. On 27 February 2018, the al-Qaeda hardliners and the remnants of the Khorasan group left HTS and formed a new group, Hurras al-Din, which became al-Qaeda's new official affiliate in Syria.

== Criticism of term ==
Some independent experts and Syrian officials questioned whether the group was distinct from Nusra Front. In an interview with Al Jazeera on 27 May 2015, Nusra Front leader Abu Mohammad al-Julani, stated that the al-Nusra Front did not have intentions to "target the West", while warning against Western Coalition airstrikes. He also alleged that "there is nothing called [the] Khorasan group. The Americans came up with it to deceive the public".

A 23 September 2014 article by the Carnegie Endowment for International Peace stated that "the sudden flurry of revelations about the 'Khorasan Group' in the past two weeks smacks of strategic leaks and political spin". The article also stated that "Whatever one decides to call it, this is not likely to be an independent organization, but rather a network-within-the-network, assigned to deal with specific tasks."

In an article in The Intercept, journalists Glenn Greenwald and Murtaza Hussain stated that "There are serious questions about whether the Khorasan Group even exists in any meaningful or identifiable manner", describing reports of the group as "propagandistic and legal rationale" for military intervention. Similarly, according to an analysis in Conflict News, "the US government made the decision to bomb this Wolf Group of Jabhat Al-Nusra, and then later came up with a way to sell to the public. This strategy ended up in the creation of 'Khorasan' a group which never existed in any form beyond the statements of US officials."
