= Islambouli =

Islambouli (Arabic: إسلامبولي) is an Arabic toponymic surname (nisba) signifying an association with Istanbul. It may refer to:

- Khalid Islambouli (1955–1982), Egyptian army officer who planned and participated in the assassination of Egyptian president Anwar Sadat in 1981
- Showqi Al-Islambouli, Egyptian Islamist, younger brother of Khalid, who attempted to assassinate Egyptian President Hosni Mubarak in 1995
