= Tamesguida offensive =

1997 armed conflict in Algeria

- Part of the Algerian Civil War
Date	15–16 February 1997
Location	Tamesguida, Algeria
Result	Algerian government victory

Belligerents
Algeria	Armed Islamic Group

Casualties and losses
Unknown	60+ rebels killed

The Tamesguida offensive was an Algerian army offensive against the Armed Islamic Group's stronghold of Tamesguida from 15 to 16 February 1997 during the Algerian Civil War.

== Offensive ==
In early 1997, the Algerian army launched a military operation in the Tamesguida region of Médéa Province, located approximately 65 kilometers southwest of Algiers. According to Liberté, an Algerian newspaper, more than 60 militants were killed during the offensive. The region had become a known stronghold for armed Islamist groups. In previous years, Tamesguida had been the site of several massacres for example in 1993, 22 soldiers were killed in an assault on military barracks, that same year 12 Croatian construction workers were killed later that same year.
