= Embassy of the United States, Sarajevo =

Embassy of the United States in Sarajevo, Bosnia and Herzegovina

Embassy of the United States in Sarajevo
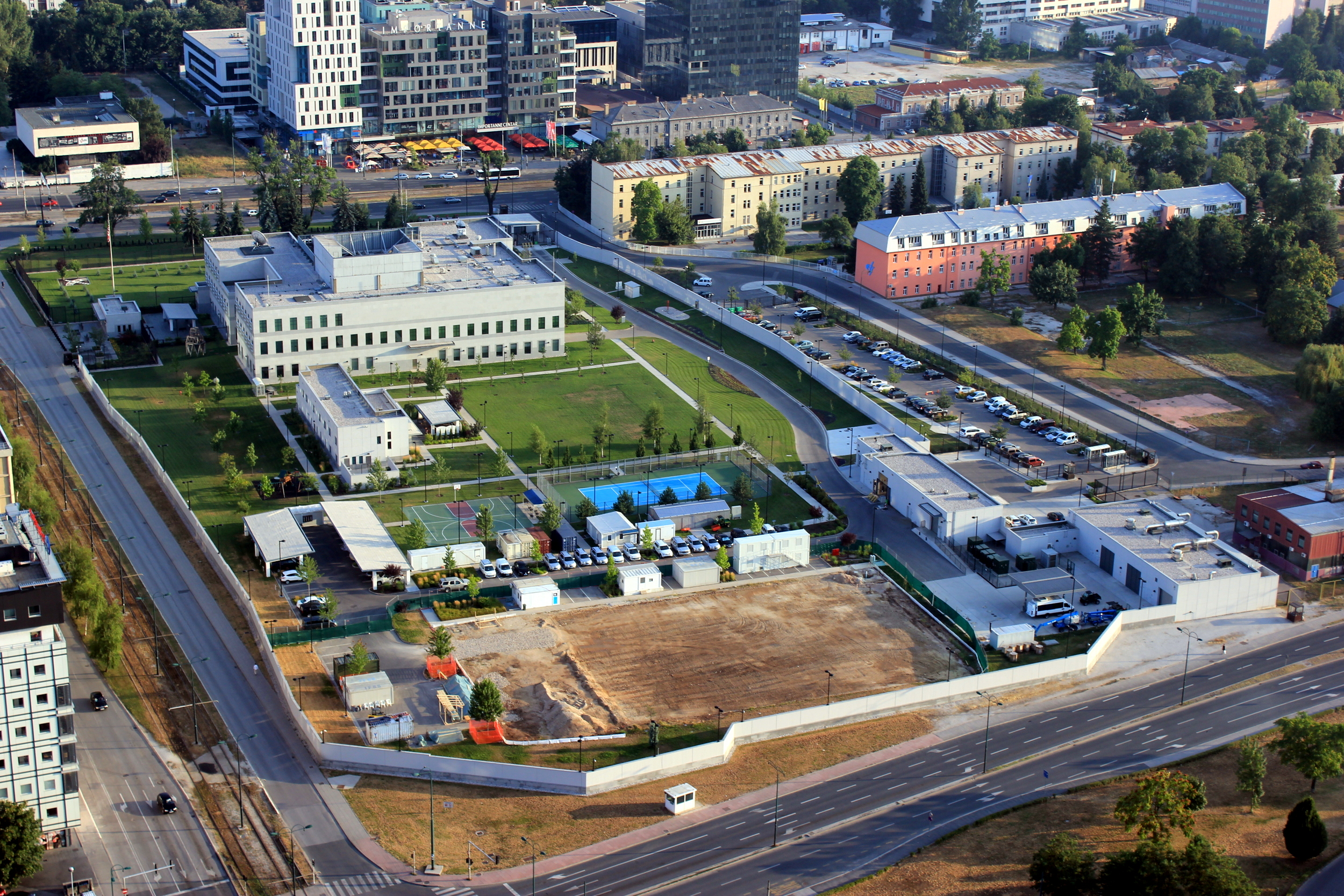
- Location: Sarajevo
- Address: 1 Robert C. Frasure Street
- Coordinates: 43°51′23.89″N 18°24′1.5″E
- Ambassador: Michael J. Murphy

The United States Department of State opened the United States Embassy in Sarajevo, Bosnia and Herzegovina, on July 4, 1994. Bosnia and Herzegovina had formerly been a part of Yugoslavia; the United States recognized the independence of Bosnia and Herzegovina on April 7, 1992.

== 2001 arrests ==
In the month following al-Qaeda's terrorist attacks on major American cities of New York City and Washington, D.C., on September 11, 2001, American intelligence analysts became concerned that Arab immigrants in Bosnia and Herzegovina planned to attack the U.S. Embassy in Sarajevo.

In early October 2001, under pressure from the United States, six men of Algerian descent were arrested by the police of Bosnia and Herzegovina. Bosnian officials said that American officials had assured them that they had evidence, including wiretaps, proving that the six men were in contact with an al-Qaeda leader in Afghanistan, but American officials did not provide that evidence.

From October 2001 to January 2002, the six men went through the Bosnian equivalent of habeas corpus. In January 2002, the case made its way to the Bosnian Supreme Court.

The six men continued to face allegations that they had participated in a plot to bomb the embassy at their 2004 Combatant Status Review Tribunals and at their annual Administrative Review Board hearings in 2005, 2006 and 2007. The men testified that their interrogators had never asked them about the plot, which led them to believe they recognized that there was no plot.

In 2008, after the Guantanamo captives had their access to habeas corpus in the US justice system restored, the United States Department of Justice acknowledged that there had never been any evidence of a bomb plot.

== 2011 attack ==
On 28 October 2011, Mevlid Jašarević, a Wahhabi Islamist, fired on the embassy, and wounded a policeman. He was eventually shot and wounded by a Ministry of Interior sniper, was given medical treatment and taken into custody afterwards. He was later sentenced to 18 years in prison.
