= Operation Ruben =

2015 police operation in Republika Spska

- Operation name: Operation Ruben
- Type: Counterterrorism

Roster
- Executed by: Police of Republika Srpska

Mission
- Target: Suspected radical Islamists

Timeline
- Date executed: 6 May 2015

Results
- Suspects: 32
- Arrests: 32

Operation Ruben (Bosnian, Croatian and Serbian: Akcija Ruben/Акција Рубен) was a police raid operation targeting what police said were suspected radical Islamists in the Republika Srpska, an entity of Bosnia and Herzegovina. It commenced on 6 May 2015, following an attack on a police station in Zvornik. Several people were arrested a week after the attack. The operation has been subject to criticism by Bosniak politicians.

== Background ==
On 27 April 2015, Nerdin Ibrić, a radical Islamist, attacked a police station in Zvornik. He killed one police officer and wounded two others before he was shot dead by other police officers. Soon after, two of Ibrić's associates were arrested.

The police theorized that the village of Dubnica near Kalesija was one of the major gathering points of radical Islamists. Following the attack, Dodik met with Serbian President Tomislav Nikolić and Prime Minister Aleksandar Vučić, asking them for intelligence and counter-terrorism assistance.

== Operation ==
On 6 May 2015, the police of Republika Srpska launched an operation aimed at "rooting out radical islamists", leading to more arrests. It was carried out exclusively by Bosnian Serb police. The Interior Ministry spokesman Milan Salamandija stated that 32 locations within Republika Srpska were searched. Salamandija said those detained were suspected of having "made supplies of weapons and explosives aimed at committing terrorist acts against the institutions of the Republika Srpska and their representatives". He added that the suspects "belong to radical movements, have fought in or returned from Syria, from which they returned as jihadist recruits. We found a certain amount of weapons and ammunition, bulletproof vests, equipment in the form of uniforms and propaganda material for recruitment." At least 30 people, all of whom are ethnic Bosniaks, were taken into custody.

== Reactions and aftermath ==
The mayor of Srebrenica, Ćamil Duraković, called the operation a "form of repression" against Bosnian Muslims in Republika Srpska.

Bakir Izetbegović, incumbent Bosniak member of the Presidency of Bosnia and Herzegovina, heavily criticised the Republika Srpska's authorities for the operation, whom he accused of reacting "excessively" and "mostly unnecessarily" arresting people. Izetbegović also said that the RS Serb police have "exceeded the measure in many things, and have stepped out of their own competencies, because the fight against terrorism is not a matter for the police, but for security services at the state level."

Nermin Nikšić said that the terrorist attack on the police station in Zvornik was being used as justification for the persecution of Bosniak returnees in the Republika Srpska. He added: "It is scandalous that 20 years after the war, those in power in Republika Srpska act as in the time when Radovan Karadžić criminally created this entity. We in the SDP believe the actions of the Republika Srpska police directly violate the Dayton Peace Agreement, which guarantees free return of all people in the pre-war places of residence." Bosniak MP Sadik Ahmetović stated: "This has turned into a hunt for all Bosniak returnees in Republika Srpska. This immediately has to stop because a selective approach can endanger peace in Bosnia and Herzegovina."

The suspects were charged with terrorism, as well as illegal production and trafficking of weapons or explosives. After their interviews by the authorities, 30 of the suspects were released from custody, while 2 remained in custody for a month. The Special Prosecutor's Office of Republika Srpska on 11 May 2016 stopped the investigation related to the charge of terrorism against all suspects.
