= Ali Ahmed Ali Hamad =

Ali Ahmed Ali Hamad is a citizen of Bahrain who testified before a United Nations War Crime investigation that the unit of foreign fighters he was a part of, in Bosnia, was financed, in part, by the Saudi High Commission for Relief of Bosnia and Herzegovina.

He is currently serving a ten-year sentence in Bosnia, for playing a role in the Mostar car bombing in 1997.

The Philadelphia Inquirer reports he is expected to testify during Re terrorist attacks on 11 September 2001—a civil suit against charities and other organizations accused of playing a support role in the attacks.

On 14 January 2009 it was reported that Ali Ahmed Ali Hamad was seeking asylum in Serbia. In exchange for asylum Ali Ahmed has promised to tell Serbian officials about crimes that were committed against Serbs and Croats by mujahedin units under the control of the Bosnian Muslim government.
