= Abu Yusuf Al-Turki =

Sniper in the Al-Nusra Front

- Born: Ümit Yaşar Toprak c. 1967; Bursa, Turkey
- Died: 23 September 2014 (aged 47); Idlib Governorate, Syria
- Cause of death: Killed by bombardment
- Other name: "The Turk"
- Citizenship: Turkish
- Military career
- Allegiance: al-Qaeda in Iraq (formerly); Taliban al-Nusra Front; Khorasan
- Conflicts: Iraq War; War in Afghanistan (2001–2021); Syrian Civil War; Military intervention against ISIL: American-led intervention in Syria

Ümit Yaşar Toprak (c. 1967 – 23 September 2014) also known by his nom de guerre Abu Yusuf Al-Turki (the "Turk") was a sniper in the Al-Nusra Front who trained fighters on how to become snipers. He was also a member of the Wolf Unit, which was described as a unit of Al-Nusra Front fighters (according to documents found by members of the Dubai-based Al Aan TV station). The Wolf Unit is reportedly another name for the Khorasan group, though there are indications that the Khorasan Group may not exist as a separate entity from Jabhat al-Nusra. Of Turkish descent, Al-Turki lived in the Turkish province of Bursa, leaving behind five children so that he could fight for the al-Nusra Front. On 23 September 2014, Al-Turki was killed during a series of a U.S.-led anti-Khorasan Group coalition airstrikes over Syria.
