= 2011 United States embassy attack in Sarajevo =

2011 terrorist attack in Sarajevo, Bosnia and Herzegovina

2011 Sarajevo embassy attack
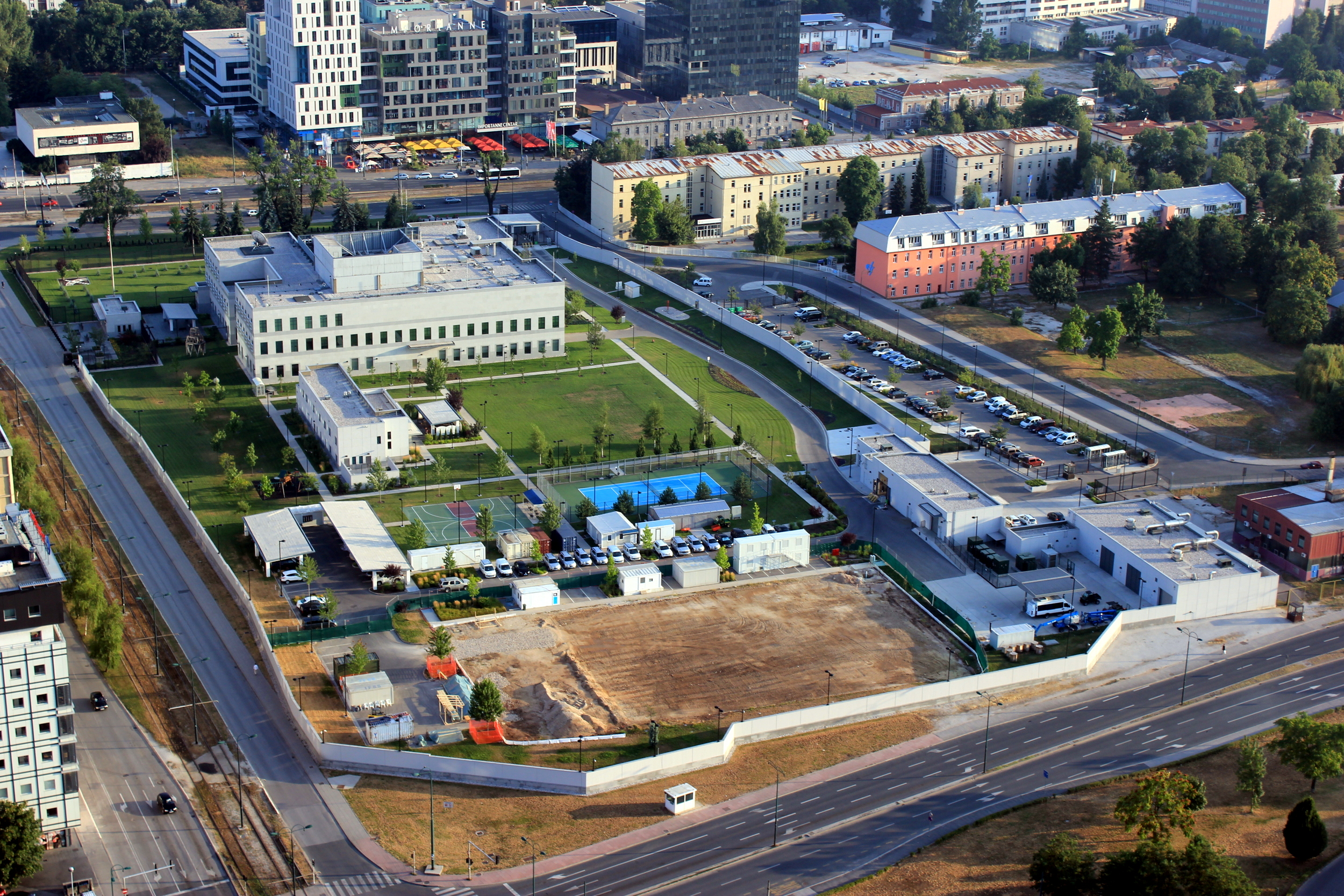
- Location: 43°51′20.32″N 18°24′5.33″E; Embassy of the United States, Sarajevo, Bosnia and Herzegovina
- Date: 28 October 2011
- Attack type: Shooting; Islamic terrorism
- Weapon: Kalashnikov rifle
- Deaths: 0
- Injuries: 2 (including the perpetrator)
- Perpetrator: Mevlid Jašarević

A gunman fired with a Kalashnikov rifle on the United States embassy in Sarajevo on 28 October 2011, resulting in one local policeman guarding the embassy being wounded in the arm by the gunman, while the shooter was wounded by a police sniper.

== Incident ==
The attacker shot 105 bullets, and severely wounded policeman Mirsad Velić. A sniper neutralized the gunman.

== Perpetrator ==
The attacker was identified as Mevlid Jašarević (b. 1988), a Bosniak holding Serbian citizenship born in Novi Pazar in southwestern Serbia, and living in well-known Wahhabist stronghold Gornja Maoča in Bosnia and Herzegovina. Jašarević lived in Vienna for a period before moving to Gornja Maoča.

== Aftermath ==
On 24 April 2012, Jašarević was indicted by a federal grand jury in the District of Columbia on charges of attempted murder and other violations in connection with the attack. A Bosnian court sentenced him on 6 December 2012 to 18 years in prison. It was then lowered to 15 years in 2013.

On 23 November 2018, Bosnian police arrested a man believed to have assisted Jašarević in the attack. Bosnian state prosecutors stated that the man was also suspected of having fought for the Islamic State and Al-Nusra Front.

== See also ==
- 2015 Zvornik police station shooting
