= 2010 Bugojno bombing =

Terrorist incident in Bosnia and Herzegovina

Bugojno bombing
- Bugojno (Bosnia and Herzegovina) Location of the attack on the map
- Location: 44°05′36.19″N 17°44′55.63″E; Ambasadora Wagnera 8, Bugojno, Bosnia and Herzegovina
- Date: 27 June 2010 c. 05:00 AM (CEST)
- Target: Police officers
- Attack type: Bombing
- Weapon: improvised bomb
- Deaths: 1 police officer
- Injuries: several other police officers
- Victim: Tarik Ljubuškić
- Assailant: Haris Čaušević
- Motive: Islamic extremism, retaliation
- Charges: Terrorism, planning of kidnapping
- Verdict: 35 years in prison
- Convicted: Haris Čaušević

The 2010 Bugojno bombing was an act of Islamic terrorism that occurred on 27 June 2010 against the police authorities of the Central Bosnia Canton in Bugojno in Bosnia and Herzegovina. In the attack, one policeman was killed and several others were injured. Haris Čaušević, the assailant, was sentenced to 35 years in prison.

== Bombing ==
Haris Čaušević, the perpetrator of the attack, belonged to a homegrown terrorist cell led by Rijad Rustempašić. The group followed the Salafist Islamic ideology, and Čaušević participated at the planning meetings. Rustempašić and several of his followers were arrested in a police operation in 2009 and charged with terrorism, conspiracy to commit a crime, and illegal possession and trade of weapons. The trial against them began in March 2010.

In retaliation, on 27 June 2010, just before 05:00 AM Čaušević detonated an improvised explosive device, planted between the police station and the parked cars, killing the police officer Tarik Ljubuškić, severely injuring his colleague Edina Hindić and injuring several other police officers. Čaušević planned to kill even more police officers, timing his attack between the two shifts. The police station and the surrounding buildings were heavily damaged, estimated to damage worth approximately €250,000. Immediately after the detonation Čaušević was arrested at a nearby parking lot. Naser Palislamović, who was also part of the Rustempašić group and was believed to be the mastermind of the attack, was arrested shortly after in Sarajevo. A third person who was supposed to fire from an AK-47 at the rushing police officers after the blast quit the night before the attack.

Čaušević also planned to kidnap a police officer and his children in order to force the authorities with the goal either to release Rustempašić, or implement the Sharia law, as well as the attacks on police patrols.

The ethnic and religious background of the victims was not a factor in the attack, as all of them were ethnic Bosniaks and Muslims. During the meetings with Rustempašić, the group discussed jihad, recruitment, implementation of Sharia, and attacking the politicians who "drifted away from Islam". Babic writes that Čaušević and his associates belong to a group of a new generation of Islamic extremists who have no regard for the civil laws in Bosnia and Herzegovina and are prepared to start a war among the Bosnian Muslims themselves.

== Trial ==
The trial against Čaušević and Palislamovivić started in March 2011 before the Court of Bosnia and Herzegovina. Čaušević pleaded not guilty throughout the trial. On 20 December 2013, Čaušević was sentenced to a record and maximum sentence of 45 years in prison for the bombing and planning to kidnap a police officer and his children. Palislamović was acquitted of charges as it was not proven he planned or committed the bombing. Čaušević's defence announced it will appeal the verdict, and the Council of Appeal of the Court of Bosnia and Herzegovina revoked the verdict for procedural reasons and ordered a new trial, which lasted from March to July 2015. After a renewed process, Čaušević was sentenced to 35 years in prison.

== See also ==
- Mostar car bombing
- Rijeka bombing
- Zvornik police station shooting
