= Ahmed Refai Taha =

Egyptian Islamist

Refa'i Ahmed Taha
- رفاعي أحمد طه
- Born: June 24, 1954; Egypt
- Died: April 5, 2016 (aged 61); Idlib, Syria
- Cause of death: Drone strike
- Other names: Refa'i Ahmed Taha Musa, Ahmed Refa'i Taha, Abu Yasser al-Masri
- Years active: 1993–2016
- Known for: Leader in al-Gama'a al-Islamiyya

Refa'i Ahmed Taha (Arabic: رفاعي أحمد طه; June 24, 1954 – April 5, 2016) or Refa'i Ahmed Taha Musa or Ahmed Refa'i Taha, alias Abu Yasser al-Masri (Arabic: أبو ياسر المصري) was an Egyptian leader of a terrorist component of al-Gama'a al-Islamiyya, having succeeded "The Blind Sheikh" Omar Abdel-Rahman in that role after the latter's arrest in 1993 and imprisonment for life in 1995. He was one of 14 people subjected to extraordinary rendition by the CIA prior to the 2001 declaration of a war on terror.

== History ==
The list of banned entities maintained by the US Treasury Department puts his date of birth at 24 June 1954, and lists additional aliases of his, including 'Issam 'Ali Muhammad 'Abdallah, ( عصام علي محمد عبد الله ). He was named as an unindicted co-conspirator in the current indictment of 21 members of al-Qaeda and affiliated groups, for various roles in the 1998 United States embassy bombings in Africa. Earlier in 1998, Taha was one of five people who signed, or are alleged to have signed, a threatening so-called fatwa against the United States and Israel and their civilians; the other signatories included Osama bin Laden and Ayman al-Zawahiri; see Fatāwā of Osama bin Laden. In 2000, Taha appeared in a video with bin Laden and al-Zawahiri which threatened a violence over the imprisonment of Omar Abdel-Rahman.

Taha was also wanted in his native Egypt, where he had been sentenced to death in the 1999 case of the Returnees from Albania. In October 2001 Taha was arrested at the Damascus airport (after fleeing the post-9/11 invasion of Afghanistan, quite probably) and quietly extradited to Egypt. Al-Qaeda claimed in 2006 that he is still alive and was in custody while some other al-Qaeda propaganda still holds up Omar Abdel-Rahman (who died in the ADX Florence prison) as the "spiritual" leader of the Egyptian side of that body. Official sources did not reveal where Taha is, or even whether he was still alive. However, it was revealed in 2012 that he was freed from prison after the fall of the regime of Hosni Mubarak, and was present at the protest in Cairo in front of the American embassy on 11 September 2012.

According to The Washington Post, in a November 2014 interview recorded in Istanbul, he asked "What are we waiting for?" and "We will not confront this [Egyptian] regime with bare chests. If they take up arms, then we will take up arms".

== Death ==
He was killed in an American drone strike in the city of Idlib, Syria where he was working with Jabhat al-Nusra, the Syrian wing of al-Qaeda around the 5th April 2016. According to The Washington Post, he had crossed into Syria from Turkey only five days before.

The Egyptian Hani al-Sibai, director of the Maqrizi Center for Historical Studies in London commenting on his death to The Washington Post, said Taha had "got what he wished for [martyrdom], he met his Lord in an American drone strike".

Taha was shown in an Al-Qaeda video released by Al Qaeda leader Ayman al-Zawahiri called "Three Sheikhs of Jihad".
