= Omar Abdel-Rahman =

Egyptian Islamist militant (1938–2017)

Omar Abdel-Rahman عمر عبد الرحمن
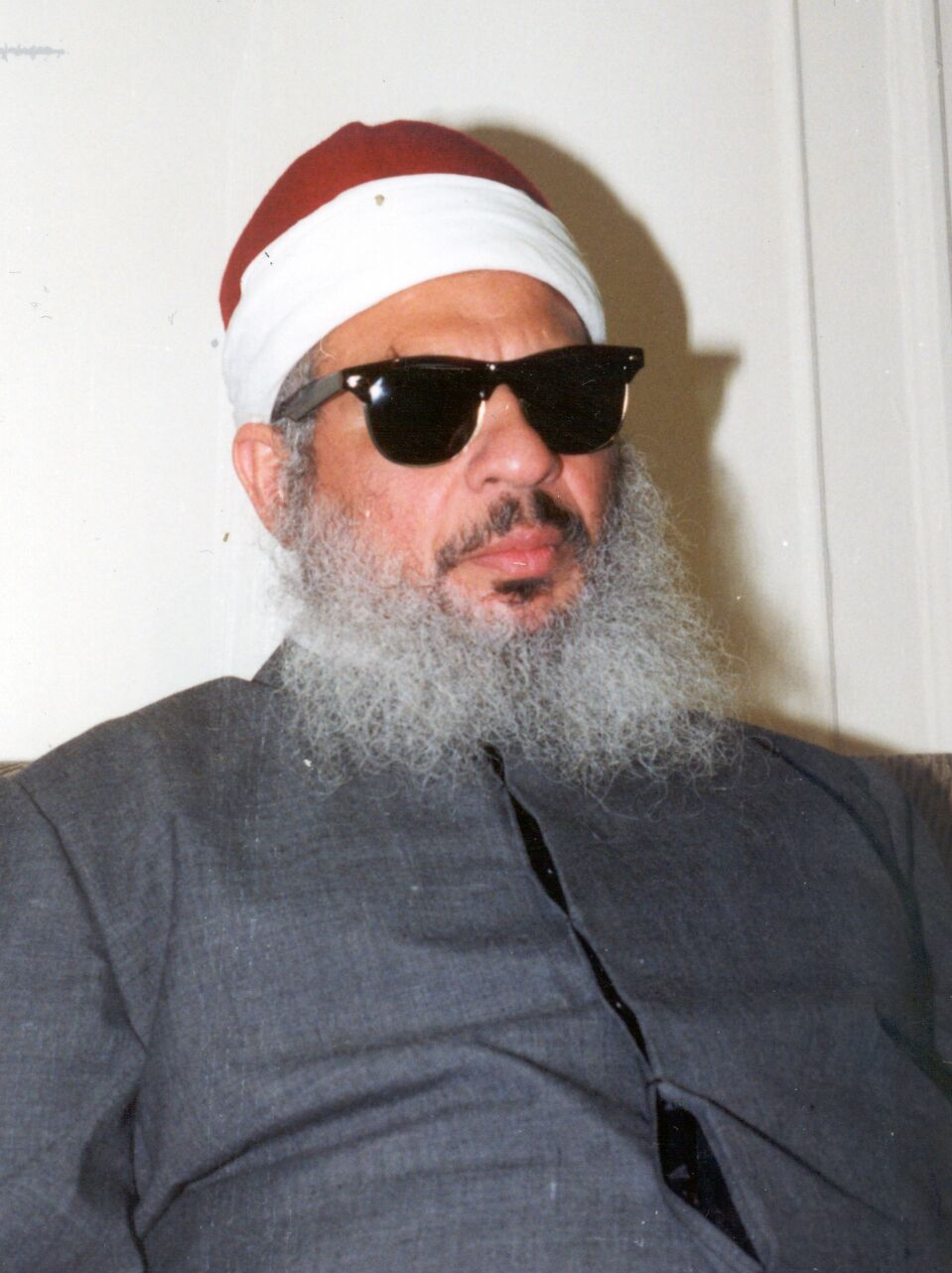
- Portrait of Abdel-Rahman
- Born: 3 May 1938; Al Gammaliyyah, Dakahlia Governorate, Kingdom of Egypt
- Died: 18 February 2017 (aged 78); FMC Butner, North Carolina, U.S.
- Other name: The Blind Sheikh
- Spouses: Aisha Hassan Gouda; Aisha Zohdi
- Children: 10
- Status: Deceased
- Convictions: Seditious conspiracy, Terrorism
- Penalty: Life imprisonment plus 15 years

Sheikh Omar Abdel-Rahman (Arabic: عمر عبد الرحمن), (ʾUmar ʾAbd ar-Raḥmān; 3 May 1938 – 18 February 2017), commonly known in the United States as "The Blind Sheikh", was a blind Egyptian Islamist and jihadist militant who served a life sentence at the Federal Medical Center, Butner near Butner, North Carolina, United States. Formerly a resident of New York City, Abdel-Rahman and nine others were convicted of seditious conspiracy in 1995. His prosecution grew out of investigations of the 1993 World Trade Center bombing.

Abdel-Rahman was the leader of Al-Jama'a al-Islamiyya (also known as "The Islamic Group"), a militant Islamist movement in Egypt that is considered a terrorist organization by the European Union and the Egyptian government. The group was responsible for many acts of violence, including the November 1997 Luxor massacre, in which 58 foreign tourists and four Egyptians were killed. The 9/11 Commission Report mentions his lectures as an inspiration for the assassination of Egyptian president Anwar Sadat.

== Youth ==
Abdel-Rahman was born in the city of al-Gamalia, Dakahlia Governorate, Egypt, on 3 May 1938. He lost his eyesight when he was 10 months old. He studied a Braille version of the Qur'an as a child, had it memorized by age 11 and was sent to an Islamic boarding school. He developed an interest in the works of Ibn Taymiyah and Sayyid Qutb. He studied at Cairo University's School of Theology and later earned a Doctorate in Tafsir (quranic interpretation) from Al-Azhar University in Cairo. His thesis was entitled Al-Qu'ran Min Khushumihi Kama Tashawwarahu Surah At-Tawba (The Qur'an's Attitude toward Its Opponents in the Perspective of Surah At-Tawba), which "received international acclaims with the highest grade." Part of the 2,000-page dissertation has been published in book form in 2006 in Egypt as Mawqif al-Qur'an min khusumih. Soon after leaving university, Abdel-Rahman began preaching against the secular regime of Egyptian president Gamal Abdel Nasser. Abdel-Rahman became one of the most prominent and outspoken Muslim Brotherhood clerics to denounce Egypt's secularism.

== Family ==
Omar Abdel-Rahman had two wives, who bore him 10 children: Aisha Hassan Gouda (7 sons), and Aisha Zohdi (3 children). His sons include Ahmed, Mohammed and Asim. Ahmed was killed in a drone strike in Afghanistan in 2011. Mohammed was captured in Pakistan in 2003. He was later extradited to Egypt and was released in 2010. Asim was a close associate of Osama bin Laden following the September 11th attacks.

== Imprisonment in Egypt ==
During the 1970s, Abdel-Rahman developed close ties with two of Egypt's most militant organizations, Egyptian Islamic Jihad and Al-Jama'a al-Islamiyya ("The Islamic Group"). By the 1980s, he had emerged as the leader of Al-jama'a al-Islamiyya, although he was still revered by followers of Egyptian Islamic Jihad, which at the time was being led by Ayman al-Zawahiri, later to become the leader of al-Qaeda. Abdel-Rahman spent three years in Egyptian jails while awaiting trial on charges of issuing a fatwa resulting in the 1981 assassination of Anwar Sadat by Egyptian Islamic Jihad.

== Afghan Mujaheddin ==
Although Abdel-Rahman was not convicted of conspiracy in the Sadat assassination, he was expelled from Egypt following his acquittal. He made his way to Afghanistan in the mid-1980s, where he contacted his former professor, Abdullah Azzam, co-founder of Maktab al-Khadamat (MAK) along with Osama bin Laden. Abdel-Rahman built a strong rapport with bin Laden during the Soviet–Afghan War and, following Azzam's murder in 1989, he assumed control of the international jihadist arm of MAK/Al-Qaeda.

In July 1990, Abdel-Rahman traveled to New York City to gain control of MAK's financial and organizational infrastructure in the United States. Abdel-Rahman is said to have established links with the Central Intelligence Agency (CIA), who offered funding and military and logistical support to those fighting the Soviets in Afghanistan.

== Activities in the US ==
Abdel-Rahman was issued a tourist visa to visit the United States by the consul of the United States Embassy in Khartoum, Sudan, despite his name being listed on a U.S. State Department terrorist watch list. Despite being known to U.S. intelligence agencies as a radical Islamist cleric, Omar Abdel Rahman was able to enter the United States due to systemic failures in U.S. immigration and intelligence coordination during the late Cold War period. At the time, terrorist watchlists maintained by the CIA, State Department, and Immigration and Naturalization Service (INS) were not integrated, and inclusion on one list did not automatically trigger visa denial. Rahman was granted a tourist visa in 1990 and later obtained permanent resident status, reportedly due to a combination of bureaucratic oversight, name transliteration inconsistencies, and policy decisions that deprioritized Islamist extremism relative to anti-communist considerations. These failures later became a major focus of congressional and interagency reviews following the 1993 World Trade Center bombing. Abdel-Rahman entered the United States in July 1990 via Saudi Arabia, Pakistan, and Sudan. The State Department revoked his tourist visa on 17 November. Despite this, in April 1991, he obtained a green card from the Immigration and Naturalization Service office in Newark, New Jersey. After leaving the U.S. to go on an overseas trip, he tried to re-enter the U.S. in August 1991. At that point, U.S. officials recognized that he was on the lookout list, and began the procedure to revoke his permanent resident status. The U.S. government still allowed him to enter the country, as he had the right to appeal the decision to revoke his residency status. Abdel-Rahman failed to appeal the decision, and on 6 March 1992, the U.S. government revoked his green card. He then requested political asylum. A hearing on that matter was held on 20 January 1993. It was later revealed that Abdel-Rahman was given most of his visa approvals by the CIA. Egyptian officials have testified that the CIA was actively assisting him in entering the US. The CIA also protected Abdel-Rahman after he arrived in the United States.

Abdel-Rahman traveled widely in the United States and Canada. Despite U.S. support for the mujahideen in Afghanistan, Abdel-Rahman spoke out vociferously against the country. He issued a fatwa in the US that declared it lawful to rob banks and kill Jews in the US. His sermons condemned Americans as the "descendants of apes and pigs who have been feeding from the dining tables of the Zionists, Communists, and colonialists". He called on Muslims to assail the West, "cut the transportation of their countries, tear it apart, destroy their economy, burn their companies, eliminate their interests, sink their ships, shoot down their planes, kill them on the sea, air, or land".

Preaching at three mosques in the New York City area, Abdel-Rahman was soon surrounded by a core group of devoted followers that included persons who would soon be responsible for the 1993 World Trade Center bombing, which took place five weeks into the Bill Clinton administration. One of Abdel-Rahman's followers, El Sayyid Nosair, was linked to the 1990 Manhattan assassination of Israeli nationalist Rabbi Meir Kahane, founder of the far-right Jewish Defense League.

Steven Emerson's 1994 television documentary Terrorists Among Us: Jihad in America contains a video of Abdel-Rahman in Detroit, calling for jihad against the "infidel".

In 1993, Egypt suffered a spate of terrorist attacks in which over 1,100 people were either injured or killed. By comparison, the number for the prior year was 322. According to The New York Times, these attacks had "shaken the Egyptian Government".

Abdel-Rahman was the spiritual leader of Al-Jama'a al-Islamiyya, which included the terrorists who were conducting these attacks. At that time, he was recording his sermons in Brooklyn on cassette tapes and sending them to Egypt. These tapes were duplicated and given to tens of thousands of followers in Cairo. In these tapes, Abdel-Rahman called for the murder of infidels, for the ousting of Hosni Mubarak, and for Egypt to become a pure Islamic state.

Mamdouh Beltagui, the head of the state information service in Egypt, told The New York Times in the early 1990s, "Sheik Omar Abdul Rahman uses New York as a base. He raises funds and sends money back to Egypt with couriers. He passes on messages to his followers, giving orders about what they should do next and who they should target. We do not understand why the U.S. authorities have allowed him to enter the country."

=== Arrest, conviction and death ===
After the first World Trade Center bombing in February 1993, the Federal Bureau of Investigation (FBI) began to investigate Abdel-Rahman and his followers more closely. An Egyptian informant wearing a listening device for the FBI managed to record Abdel-Rahman saying he preferred attacks be concentrated on US military targets, but also stating acts of violence against civilian targets were not illicit. The most startling plan, the government charged, was to set off five bombs in 10 minutes, blowing up the United Nations, the Lincoln and Holland tunnels, the George Washington Bridge and a federal building housing the FBI. Government prosecutors showed videotapes of the defendants mixing bomb ingredients in a garage before their arrest in 1993. Abdel-Rahman was arrested on 24 June 1993, along with nine of his followers. On 1 October 1995, he was convicted of seditious conspiracy, solicitation to murder Egyptian President Hosni Mubarak, conspiracy to murder President Mubarak, solicitation to attack a U.S. military installation, and conspiracy to conduct bombings; in 1996 he was sentenced to life in solitary confinement without parole.

Abdel-Rahman began serving his life sentence at the FMC Rochester in Minnesota. After the September 11 attacks, he was transferred to the FMC Butner in North Carolina. He died there on 18 February 2017 at the age of 78 due to complications from diabetes and coronary artery disease.

It was arranged for the U.S. to transport his body to Egypt for his funeral. His funeral was mentioned in an article in the publication Al-Masra by the terrorist group Al-Qaeda in the Arabian Peninsula.

== Efforts for release ==
In a speech to supporters in Cairo's Tahrir Square on 30 June 2012, Mohamed Morsi briefly mentioned that he would work to free Omar Abdel-Rahman, along with other Egyptians who were arrested during the revolution. A Brotherhood spokesperson later said that the extradition was for humanitarian reasons and that Morsi did not intend to overturn Abdel-Rahman's criminal convictions.

During the 2013 In Aménas hostage crisis, a Mauritanian news organization reported that the kidnappers had offered to swap American hostages in Algeria for the release of Abdel-Rahman and Aafia Siddiqui. US State Department spokeswoman Victoria Nuland stated that the United States would not negotiate with the terrorists.

== Legacy ==
Abdel-Rahman's imprisonment became a rallying point for Islamic militants around the world, including Al Qaeda and Osama bin Laden. In 1997, members of his group Al-Jama'a al-Islamiyya conducted two attacks against European visitors to Egypt, including the massacre of 58 Western tourists at Deir el-Bahri in Luxor. In addition to killing women and children, the attackers mutilated a number of bodies and distributed leaflets throughout the scene demanding Abdel-Rahman's release.

In 2005, three members of Abdel-Rahman's legal team, lawyer Lynne Stewart, translator Mohamed Yousry and postal clerk Ahmed Abdel Sattar, were convicted of facilitating communication between Abdel-Rahman and members of the US designated-terrorist organization Al-Jama'a al-Islamiyya in Egypt. They received long federal prison sentences, based on their violated obligation to keep Abdel-Rahman incommunicado while providing him legal counsel.

Qasim al Raymi, leader of Al Qaeda in the Arabian Peninsula, eulogized Abdul Rahman on 6 March. His eulogy was critical of the US.

== See also ==
- Army of the Men of the Naqshbandi Order
- Mohammed Omar Abdel-Rahman
