= 1995 Rijeka bombing =

Terrorist bombing in Rijeka, Croatia

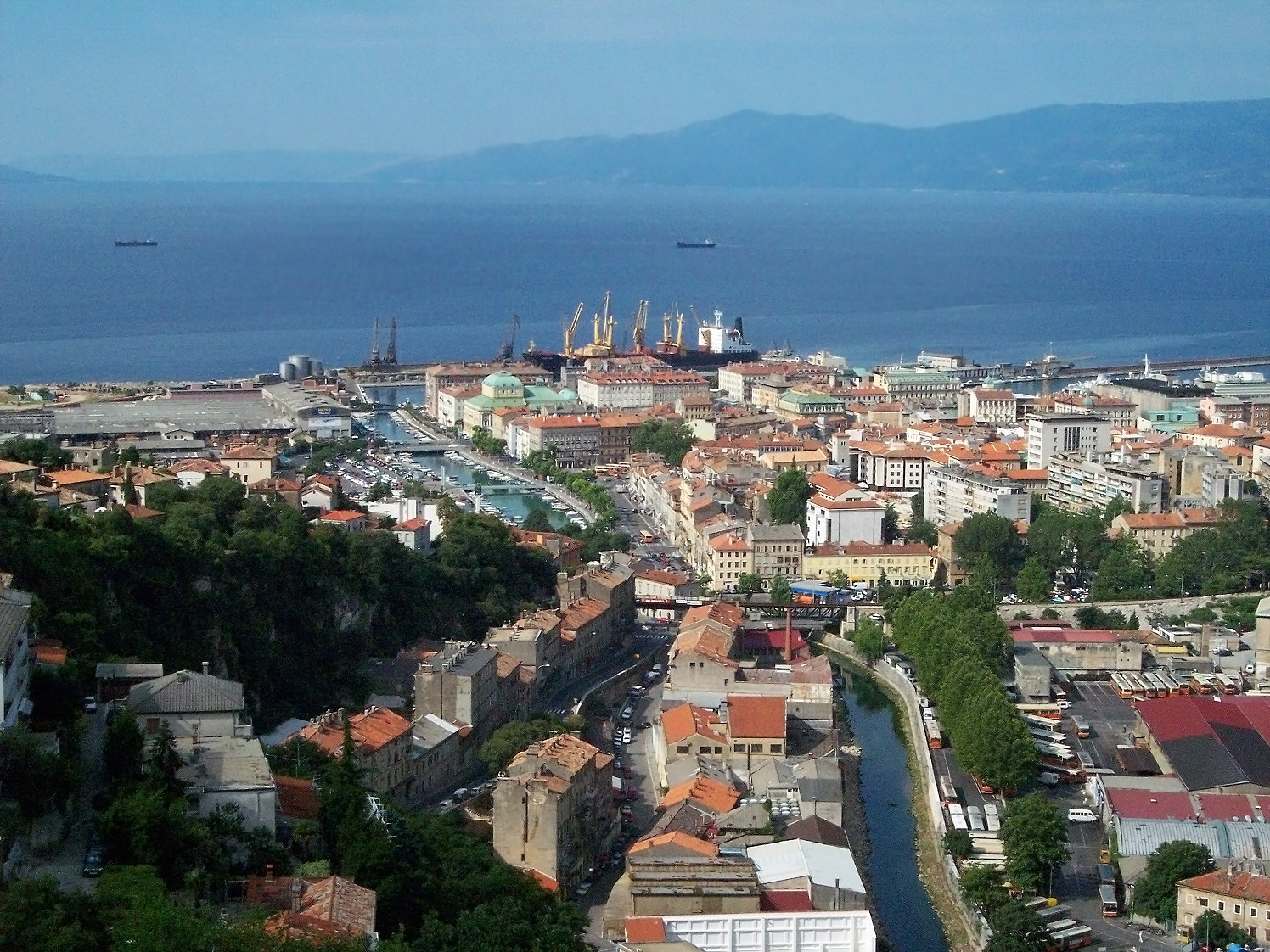
- Rijeka in 2005
- Location: 45°19′39.7″N 14°26′43.4″E; Rijeka, Croatia
- Date: 20 October 1995; 31 years ago 11:21 AM CET
- Target: Police station
- Attack type: Suicide attack; terrorism
- Weapons: Car bomb, 70 kg of TNT
- Deaths: 1 (the perpetrator)
- Injuries: 29
- Perpetrator: John Fawza (al-Gama'a al-Islamiyya)
- Motive: Retaliation for the arrest of Tal'at Fu'ad Qasim by the Croatian Defense Council
- Accused: Hassan al-Sharif Mahmud Saad (al-Gama'a al-Islamiyya)

The 1995 Rijeka bombing was a suicide attack perpetrated by the Islamic terrorist organization al-Gama'a al-Islamiyya against Croatia on 20 October. At 11:21 AM CET, a car with a bomb drove into a local police station in Rijeka. After the car detonated near the stairwell, the driver was immediately killed and 29 civilians were injured. Croatian and U.S. intelligence agencies identified al-Gama'a al-Islamiyya as responsible and many of its senior leaders residing in the region were killed on 14 December.

== Background ==
In the last days of the Bosnian War, the Croatian Defense Council (HVO), a Bosnian Croat military force, captured Tal'at Fu'ad Qasim when he attempted to illegally enter Bosnia and Herzegovina. Qasim, an important member of al-Gama'a al-Islamiyya, was soon transferred to Egypt with the active help of Croatia. The arrest, extradition, and de facto Croatian influence within the HVO were stated motivations for orchestrating the terrorist attack on Croatian soil.

== Attack ==
At 11:21 AM Central European Time (CET), a Fiat 131 Mirafiori entered the parking lot of the Primorje-Gorski Kotar County police headquarters. Due to the 90-degree turn needed to enter the lot, the vehicle moved slowly. Near the entrance, the driver did not park in the parking spaces for civilians, but instead started to accelerate towards the wall at the end of the parking lot. Due to the low security measures, this incident was not noticed before the attack itself took place. After 15–20 meters, passing 8 to 10 available parking spaces in the small lot, the Fiat crashed into the stairs leading to the police station and exploded. The time of explosion was recorded as 11:22 a.m. local time (10:22 UTC). Subsequently, a police investigation found out the car was loaded with 70 kg (150 lb) of highly explosive TNT. The police also found a part of a Canadian passport inside the remains of the attacker's car. The next day, representatives of the al-Gama'a al-Islamiyya terrorist organization from Egypt claimed responsibility for the attack, requesting extradition of Qasim.

Due to an error made by the attackers, the bombing did not cause fatalities, aside from the suicide bomber himself. The police headquarters is located on a higher ground than the parking lot itself, requiring the stairs in the first place. The other apparent miscalculation involved the size of the parking lot, where the Fiat 131 had neither the space and velocity, nor the horsepower, to climb the stairs and destroy the police station wall. As a result, the police station remained upright and only 29 injuries were recorded. The bomb carved a large crater in the ground, damaging nearby buildings and vehicles.

== Aftermath ==
Croatian and U.S. intelligence agencies examined the video footage of the attack. They jointly concluded that Hassan al-Sharif Mahmud Saad had organized the bombing. Saad had come to live in Bosnia that year; previously, he had been living in Italy. Soon after the attack, Bosnian officials discovered that Saad was planning a new terrorist attack, against NATO forces, planned for December 1995. A few days after that attack failed, he was killed in central Bosnia in a firefight with Croatian HVO forces. The leader of El Mujahid, the al-Gama'a al-Islamiyya unit responsible for the training of Muslim fighters for the Bosnian War, was Sheik Anwar Shaaban, a former mujahideen during the Soviet invasion of Afghanistan. Shaaban, along with other four top islamic militants, was shot and killed on 14 December 1995 at a checkpoint set up by the HVO near Žepče. A month after the attack, the group's leader, Tal'at Fu'ad Qasim, was arrested in Croatia. He was questioned by Croatian and U.S. authorities via extraordinary rendition and then executed by the Egyptian government.

== See also ==
- 1993 Hidroelektra workers massacre
- 1997 Mostar car bombing
- 2015 kidnapping of Tomislav Salopek by ISIL
- 2020 St. Mark's Square shooting
