= 2015 Zvornik police station shooting =

Mass shooting in Bosnia and Herzegovina

- Zvornik (Bosnia and Herzegovina)
- Location: 44°22′46.97″N 19°06′08.28″E; Zvornik, Republika Srpska, Bosnia and Herzegovina
- Date: 27 April 2015; 19:00 (CEST)
- Target: Police officers
- Attack type: Spree shooting
- Weapons: 2 shotguns; pistol
- Deaths: 2 (including attacker)
- Injuries: 2
- Perpetrator: Nerdin Ibrić
- Motive: Islamic extremism Revenge

On 27 April 2015, a gunman attacked a police station in Zvornik in the Republika Srpska entity of Bosnia and Herzegovina. He killed one police officer and wounded two others before being shot dead by other police officers. This was the first attack of its kind in Republika Srpska; attacks have occurred in the other entity, the Federation of Bosnia and Herzegovina, including the 1997 Mostar car bombing.

The Police of Republika Srpska launched a counter-terrorist operation codenamed Operation Ruben, with the declared aim of disrupting targets suspected of possessing firearms and involvement in radical Islamist circles. The move was heavily criticised by several Bosniak politicians because of the absence of coordination with the central government, with some suggesting that the operation was calculated to intimidate Bosniak refugees who had returned to live on what is today Republika Srpska's territory.

== Shooting ==
Nerdin Ibrić, born in 1991 in Sapna near Zvornik, drove up to the Zvornik police station at around 19:00. When a sentry told him that he could not park in front of the station, Ibrić produced a rifle and opened fire at the officer.

Several Bosnian-language news portals claimed that Ibrić had never shouted "Allahu akbar", citing another news portal which only reported that he had shouted profanities and threats. However, the following day, the same portal reported that Ibrić had initially yelled profanities and threats, but then began shouting Allahu akbar.

Police officer Dragan Đurić was struck by several bullets, and killed. Ibrić then went inside the station and continued shooting, wounding two other officers, after which he was killed by the police. The wounded policemen were quickly transferred to the local hospital. Police believe that the attack was well-planned in advance, as Ibrić knew exactly when the officers' shifts switched, and thus began his spree when the most policemen would be inside the station.

The Minister of Interior of the Republika Srpska, Dragan Lukač, said that the assailant was probably a Wahhabist and called the shooting an act of terrorism. The President of Republika Srpska, Milorad Dodik, criticised police and security agencies at the state-level for not providing Bosnian Serb authorities with any useful information about potential terrorist plots prior to the attack. However, three days prior to the shooting, the Intelligence-Security Agency of Bosnia and Herzegovina (OSA-OBA BiH) had informed police agencies in the country that there was a possibility of a terrorist attack as retribution for the recent arrests of several individuals of Bosniak origin in Australia who had planned terrorist attacks there.

Ibrić was buried on 30 April 2015 at a local cemetery in Kučić Kula near Zvornik in accordance with religious rituals with several hundred people attending his funeral.

== Investigation ==
On the day of the shooting, the State Investigation and Protection Agency (SIPA) had arrested Ibrić's friend, Avdulah Hasanović. Hasanović was previously arrested by SIPA during the anti-terrorist action Operation Damascus, as he was suspected of being a member of the Islamic State of Iraq and the Levant (ISIL). Hasanović was known to have participated in the Syrian Civil War in 2014. Another one of Ibrić's associates, Kasim Mehidić, was arrested. After a two-day interrogation, both Hasanović and Mehidić were handed over to the State Attorney of Bosnia and Herzegovina for further investigation. The Court of Bosnia and Herzegovina ordered that they be detained for one month under suspicion that they had recruited Ibrić for the attack.

Soon after Ibrić's two friends were arrested, the police expanded its investigation to include other suspected radical Islamists, some of whom were also veterans of the Syrian Civil War. The police suspect that the village of Dubnica near Kalesija is one of the major gathering points of radical Islamists. Soon after the attack, Dodik met with Serbian President Tomislav Nikolić and Prime Minister Aleksandar Vučić, asking them for intelligence and counter-terrorism assistance.

On 6 May, the Republika Srpska launched Operation Ruben in order to root out suspected radical Islamists from the entity, detaining dozens of Muslim Bosniaks, as well as confiscating weapons, ammunition and propaganda material believed to be aimed to encourage Bosnian citizens to join fighters in Syria. The operation has been criticised by multiple Bosniak politicians, including Bakir Izetbegović who said that the Republika Srpska police had "crossed the line". The Mayor of Srebrenica said that the Serb police stormed the homes of Bosniaks who returned after the war and carried out arrests without explanation. He called it a "form of repression".

== Possible motives ==
The Presidency and the Council of Ministers of Bosnia and Herzegovina and the Government of Republika Srpska characterised the shooting as a terrorist attack. The United States Embassy to Bosnia and Herzegovina also referred to it as terrorism. The Office of the High Representative for Bosnia and Herzegovina condemned the attack in a press release but did not describe it as a terrorist operation.

The Sarajevo-based newspaper Dnevni avaz claimed the Bijeli Potok massacre that occurred on 1 June 1992 as a possible motive, when 668 Bosniaks of Zvornik, among whom was Ibrić's father Sejfo, were separated from their families and killed by the Army of Republika Srpska and police of Zvornik, with help of paramilitary units from Serbia. According to Balkan Insight, their names were mentioned among more than 850 Serb soldiers and policemen on a 2004 Republika Srpska government report on the Srebrenica massacres. However, one of the officials who made the report explained that it just listed military and police personnel who were on duty in 1995 in the territory between Zvornik and Višegrad (including Srebrenica); the official said that "it is insane to claim that all of them committed war crimes".

== See also ==
- 2010 Bugojno bombing
- 1995 Rijeka bombing
