= 1997 Mostar car bombing =

Terrorist incident in Bosnia and Herzegovina

- Mostar (Bosnia and Herzegovina)
- Location: 43°20′52.18″N 17°48′07.84″E; Mostar, Herzegovina-Neretva Canton, Bosnia and Herzegovina
- Date: 18 September 1997; 23:40 (CEST)
- Attack type: Car bomb, Islamic terrorism
- Deaths: None
- Injuries: 29
- Motive: Islamic extremism and retribution against the HVO

A car bomb exploded in Mostar, Bosnia and Herzegovina on 18 September 1997, injuring 29 people and destroying or damaging 120 apartments, as well as 120 vehicles. The attack is thought to have targeted Croat civilians and policemen as retribution against the Croatian Defence Council (HVO), which had fought Bosnian Muslim forces for control of the city during the Croat–Bosniak War. The attack was carried out by radical Islamists.

The attack was organized by Ahmad Zuhair Handala, with his associates, Ali Ahmed Ali Hamad from Bahrain, Nebil Ali Hil, nicknamed Abu Yemen, Saleh Nedal and Vlado Popovski from North Macedonia. At least two of the arrested had links to Al-Qaeda. The attackers did not mention whether the bombing was religiously motivated or whether it was retribution against the Croatian Defense Council.

== History ==
On 18 September 1997, a car bomb exploded on Splitska Street, in front of a police station in majority-Croat western Mostar. During the Bosnian War, the building housed the Ministry of Internal Affairs of the Croatian Republic of Herzeg-Bosnia. Twenty-nine people were either seriously or lightly wounded in the attack, including three police officers. The explosion created a crater 240 centimetres (94 in) wide and 85 centimetres (33 in) deep. In total, 120 apartments sustained some level of damage, of which 56 were completely destroyed. About 120 vehicles were also affected, including 46 that were completely destroyed.

NATO-led Stabilization Force (SFOR) peacekeepers were the first to arrive at the scene. An investigation commenced the following day, and was carried out by the criminal police of the Herzegovina-Neretva Canton with help from experts from Zagreb and Split. Immediately after the attack, domestic and foreign security agencies began searching for the perpetrators. Bosniak politicians, including prime minister Haris Silajdžić and media outlets, accused the Croats of carrying out the attack. As it occurred shortly after the Croat and Bosniak city police forces were united, and after the Croatian Democratic Union of Bosnia and Herzegovina (HDZ BiH) secured victory at the general elections, SFOR suspected three possible motives. In their opinion, it was either politically motivated and designed to sabotage the re-unification of the city's police force; mafia-related; or carried out by Islamic extremists with the goal of creating as many casualties and causing as much damage as possible. SFOR considered the latter hypothesis the least likely of the three, as it expected that a terrorist group would have taken responsibility immediately after such an attack.

Handala's name was made public by the leader of the Wahhabi community in Bosnia and Herzegovina, Alu Husin Imad, known as Abu Hamza. Abu Hamza told reporters that "[the Wahhabist community] doesn't justify, but understands the crime". Handala and his associates apparently carried out the attack as retribution to the Croatian Defence Council (HVO), which had fought the predominantly Muslim Bosniaks during the war.

== Arrests and trial ==
In September 1998, Italian attorneys issued an international warrant for a group of criminals suspected of multiple crimes in Italy, including terrorist acts. Among the group was Saleh Nedal. He was arrested in Travnik in April 1999. Investigating judge Mirjana Grubešić and district attorney Marinko Jurčević, asked the County Court in Travnik to comply with the Italian request to extradite Saleh but the court, presided by Senad Begović, ruled against Saleh's extradition in July 1999. The same judge later signed a decree which terminated Saleh's imprisonment. The Supreme Court of the Federation of Bosnia and Herzegovina, presided by judge Nazif Sulman, affirmed the decree in August 1999. Saleh later warned Zuhair, who fled Bosnia before the start of his trial on 18 September 1998.

During the police investigation, Ali Ahmed Ali Hamad admitted to committing the crime and made the same admission before the investigating judge. However, he denied any involvement at the trial, stating that the police had coerced him by promising a quick trial followed by his release. He was not charged with terrorism, but for constructing a car bomb, a criminal act which endangered the general safety and as a result, all the accused received lighter sentences. Zuhair was tried in absentia and sentenced to ten years in prison, while Ali Hamad received eight- and Nebil Ali Hil five years in prison. Handala was eventually arrested after the September 11 attacks, and in 2007 was being detained in the Guantanamo Bay detention camp.

== See also ==
- 1995 Rijeka bombing
- 2010 Bugojno bombing
- 2015 Zvornik police station shooting

== Footnotes ==
=== Books ===
- Hećimović, Esad (2009). Garibi: mudžahedini u BiH 1992-1999. Dan graf. ISBN 978-86-83517-48-0.
- Kohlmann, Evan (2004). Al-Qaida's Jihad in Europe: The Afghan-Bosnian Network. Berg Publishers. ISBN 978-1-85973-802-3.
- Schindler, John R. (2007). Unholy Terror: Bosnia, Al-Qa'ida, and the Rise of Global Jihad. New York City: Zenith Press. ISBN 9780760330036.
- Vranješ, Nevenko; Lalić, Velibor; Šikman, Mile (2021). "Social Threats, Challenges and Risks in Bosnia and Herzegovina: Social Security Perspectives". Social Security in the Balkans: An Overview of Social Policy in Croatia, Albania, Bosnia and Hercegovina, Greece, Romania and Bulgaria. Vol. 1. BRILL. ISBN 9789004466579.

=== Journals ===
- Lučić, Ivo (2001). "Bosnia and Herzegovina and Terrorism". National Security and the Future. 2 (3–4). Zagreb: St. George Association. ISSN 1332-4454.

=== News articles ===
- "15 godina od razorne eksplozije u Splitskoj ulici" (in Croatian). Bljesak.info. 18 September 2012. Archived from the original on 2 January 2015.
- Gradišić, Mirela (6 December 2012). "Dosad je izrečeno 11 presuda za krivično djelo terorizam" (in Bosnian). Federalna televizija. Archived from the original on 2 January 2015.
- "Jihad, bought and sold". ISN. 26 June 2009.
- Krešić, Zoran (20 September 2011). "U istrazi najmanje sumnjali da su teroristi stavili autobombu" (in Croatian). Večernji list.
- "Mostar: 17 godina od terorističkog napada auto bombom u Splitskoj ulici" (in Croatian). Hercegovina.info. 18 September 2014.
- "Subjects about politics in Bih in May 1998". dDH.
- "Vast investigation in Bosnia Herzegovina". Free Republic. 30 September 2001.
- Maroević, Rade (28 April 2015). "Хронологија терористичких напада у БиХ" (in Serbian). Radio Television of Serbia.
