= Al-Jama'a al-Islamiyya =

Egyptian Sunni Islamist movement

- الجماعة الإسلامية
- Leaders: Omar Abdel-Rahman †; Karam Zuhdi; Ala Mohieddin; Tal'at Fu'ad Qasim (executed); Ahmed Refai Taha †
- Dates active: 1992–1998 (as an armed group)
- Headquarters: Cairo, Egypt
- Active regions: Egypt, Syria
- Ideology: Sunni Islamism; Islamic extremism (formerly); Salafi jihadism (formerly)

Al-Jamāʻah al-Islāmīyah (Arabic: الجماعة الإسلامية, lit. "Islamic Group") is an Egyptian Sunni Islamist movement based in Egypt and Syria. It is considered a terrorist organization by many world nations including the European Union, the United Kingdom, Israel, Russia, Canada, as well as the United Nations. It was similarly designated by the United States from 1997 to 2022 and has since remained under American sanctions. The group was dedicated to the overthrow of the Egyptian government and replacing it with an Islamic state. Since the 2013 Egyptian coup d'état and overthrow of President Mohamed Morsi, the group has committed to non-violent religious activities.

Founded in the 1990s, the al-Gamāʻah al-islāmīyah fought an insurgency against the Egyptian government from 1992 to 1998 during which at least 796 Egyptian and al-Jamāʻah al-islāmīyah combatants as well as civilians were killed. Iran and Sudan provided proxy support for the group alongside al-Qaeda. The Egyptian government was supported by the U.S., U.K. and E.U. nations. al-Gamāʻah al-islāmīyah orchestrated major attacks across the world, including the 1995 Rijeka bombing, 1996 Cairo shooting, and 1997 Luxor massacre, among others. Active as a militant movement from 1992 to 1998, al-Jamāʻah al-islāmīyah has since seen significantly degraded financial and combat infrastructure due to collective American, Egyptian, and Croatian military interventions.

The group's imprisoned leadership – led by Omar Abdel-Rahman – renounced violence in 2003 and again in 2011. In 2006, the Egyptian government initiated a limited prison release program for the group. Following the Egyptian Revolution of 2011, the movement formed a political party, the Building and Development Party, which gained 13 seats in the 2011–2012 elections to the lower house of the Egyptian Parliament. Since the 2010s, al-Jamāʻah al-islāmīyah have closely cooperated with the Muslim Brotherhood but struggled to integrate into Egyptian society.

== History ==
=== Origins in universities ===
Al-Jamāʻah al-islāmīyah began as an umbrella organization for Egyptian militant student groups, formed, like the Egyptian Islamic Jihad, after the leadership of the Muslim Brotherhood renounced violence in the 1970s.

In its early days, the group was primarily active on university campuses, and was mainly composed of university students. Originally they were a minority in the Egyptian student movement which was dominated by leftist Nasserists and Marxists. The leftists were strongly critical of the new Sadat government, and urged Egypt to fight a war of revenge against Israel, while President Sadat wanted to wait and rebuild the military. However, with some "discrete, tactical collaboration" with the government, who sought a "useful counterweight" to its leftist opponents, the group(s) began to grow in influence in 1973.

The Jama'at spread on campuses and won up to one-third of all student union elections. These victories provided a platform from which the associations campaigned for Islamic dress, the veiling of women, and the segregation of classes by gender. Secular university administrators opposed these goals. By March 1976, they were "dominant force" in the student movement and by 1977 "they were in complete control of the universities and had driven the left organizations underground."

=== Expansion ===
Having once been favored by the Egyptian government of Anwar Sadat they now threatened it, opposing what they believed was a "shameful peace with the Jews," (the Camp David Accords with Israel). By 1979, their numbers steadily grew. In 1979, Sadat sought to diminish the influence of the associations through a law that transferred most of the authority of the student unions to professors and administrators. During the 1980s, Islamists gradually penetrated college faculties. At Assiut University, which was the scene of some of the most intense clashes between Islamists and their opponents (including security forces, secularists, and Copts), the president and other top administrators – who were Islamists – supported Jama'at demands to end mixed-sex classes and to reduce total female enrollment. In other universities Jama'at also forbade the mixing of genders, films, concerts, and dances, and enforced their bans with clubs and iron bars. From the universities the groups reached out to make new recruits, preaching in poor neighbourhoods of cities, and to rural areas. and after a crackdown against them, inmates of Egyptian jails.

In April 1981, the group became involved in clan feuds about livestock or property lines between Coptic and Muslim Egyptians in the vicinity of Minya, Egypt. The group believed in the position of tributary or dhimmi for Christians in Egypt and opposed any signs of Coptic "arrogance" (istikbar), such as Christian cultural identity and opposition to an Islamic state. The group distributed a leaflet accusing Egypt's one Christian provincial governor (appointed by the government) of providing automatic weapons to Christians to attack Muslims, and the Sadat administration of following orders given by the United States.

=== Crackdown ===
In June 1981, a sectarian Muslim-Copt conflict broke out in the al-Zawaiyya Al Hamra district of Cairo. Over three days of fighting, 17 people were killed, 112 injured, and 171 public and private buildings were damaged. "Men and women were slaughtered; babies thrown from windows, their bodies crushed on the pavement below; there was looting, killing and arson." The group were accused of participating in the incident and in September 1981, one month before the assassination of Sadat, the al-Jamāʻah al-islāmīyah were dissolved by the state, their infrastructure was destroyed and their leaders arrested by the State Security Investigations Service.

=== Assassination of president Anwar Sadat ===
In 1980, the Egyptian Islamic Jihad under the leadership of Muhammad abd-al-Salam Faraj, formed a coalition with the Jama'at under the leadership of Karam Zuhdi, with both agreeing to follow the guidance of Sheikh Omar Abdel-Rahman. One of Faraj's groups was responsible for the assassination of President Anwar Sadat in 1981. Members in Asyut launched a rapidly suppressed uprising two days after the assassination. Following the assassination, Karam Zuhdi expressed regret for conspiring with Egyptian Islamic Jihad in the assassination, according to the Council on Foreign Relations. Zuhdi was among the 900 militants who were set free in April 2006 by the Egyptian government.

=== Omar Abdel-Rahman ===
The cleric Omar Abdel-Rahman was the spiritual leader of the movement. He was accused of participating in the World Trade Center 1993 bombings conspiracy, and was convicted and sentenced to life imprisonment for his espousal of a subsequent conspiracy to bomb New York City landmarks, including the United Nations and FBI. The Islamic Group had publicly threatened to retaliate against the United States if Rahman was not released from prison. The group later renounced violence and their leaders and members were released from prison in Egypt. Abdel-Rahman died on 18 February 2017.

=== 1990s terrorism campaign ===
The Islamic group, by the late 1980s, had become more organized and adopted an official logo: "an upright sword standing on an open Qur'an with an orange sun rising in the background," encircled by the Qur'anic verse that Abdel Rahman had quoted at his trials while trying to explain his interpretation of jihad to the judges:

وَقَاتِلُوهُمْ حَتَّى لاَ تَكُونَ فِتْنَةٌ وَيَكُونَ الدِّينُ لِلّهِ فَإِنِ انتَهَواْ فَلاَ عُدْوَانَ إِلاَّ عَلَى الظَّالِمِينَ Fight them on until there is no more Tumult, and there prevail justice and faith in Allah; but if they cease, Let there be no hostility except to those who practise oppression.

This became the official motto of the group. The 1990s saw al-Jamāʻah al-islāmīyah engage in an extended campaign of violence, including the targeting of tourists and foreigners. Egypt's tourism sector was negatively impacted. Victims of campaign against the Egyptian state from 1992 to 1997 totaled more than 1200 and included the head of the counter-terrorism agency (Major General Raouf Khayrat), a speaker of parliament (Rifaat al-Mahgoub), dozens of European tourists and Egyptian bystanders, and over 100 Egyptian police.

The 1991 killing of the group's leader, Ala Mohieddin, by security forces, led Al-Gama'a al-Islamiyya to murder Egypt's speaker of parliament in retaliation. In June 1995, working together with Egyptian Islamic Jihad, the group orchestrated an attempt on the life of President Mubarak, led by Mustafa Hamza, a senior Egyptian member of the Al-Qaeda and commander of the military branch of the Al-Gama'a al-Islamiyya. Mubarak escaped unharmed and retaliated with crackdown on GI members by the State Security and their families in Egypt. Tal'at Fu'ad Qasim was arrested in Croatia in 1995.

==== Failed nonviolence initiative ====
By 1997, nearly 20,000 Islamists were in custody in Egypt and thousands more had been killed by the security forces. In July of that year, Islamist lawyer Montassir al-Zayyat brokered a deal between the al-Jamāʻah al-islāmīyah and the Egyptian government, called the Nonviolence Initiative, whereby the movement formally renounced violence. The next year the government released 2,000 members of the Islamic Group. After the initiative was declared Sheikh Omar Abdul Rahman also gave his approval from his prison cell in the United States, later withdrawing it. The initiative divided the Islamic Group between members in Egypt who supported it and those in exile who wanted the attacks to continue. Leading the opposition was EIJ leader Ayman Zawahiri who termed it "surrender" in angry letters to the London newspaper Al-Sharq al-Awsat.

==== Temple of Hatshepsut attack ====
Zawahiri enlisted Ahmed Refai Taha, both exiles in Afghanistan with him, to sabotage the initiative with a terrorism attack. On 17 November 1997, the al-Jamāʻah al-islāmīyah campaign climaxed with the attack at the Temple of Hatshepsut (Deir el-Bahri) in Luxor, in which six men dressed in police uniforms machine-gunned and dismembered 58 foreign tourists and four Egyptians. Altogether 71 people were killed. The day after the attack, Refai Taha claimed the attackers intended only to take the tourists hostage. Others denied Islamist involvement completely. Sheikh Omar Abdel-Rahman blamed Israelis for the killings, and Zawahiri maintaining the Egyptian police had done it.

When Refai Taha signed the al-Qaeda fatwa "International Islamic Front for Jihad Against Jews and Crusaders" to kill Crusaders and Jews on behalf of the Islamic Group, he was "forced to withdraw his name" from the fatwa, explaining to fellow members ... than he had "only been asked over the telephone to join in a statement of support for the Iraqi people."

==== Major attacks ====
Major attacks by al-Jamāʻah al-islāmīyah:

- 8 June 1992 – assassination of Farag Foda.
- 26 June 1995 – attempt to assassinate Egyptian President Hosni Mubarak in Addis Ababa, Ethiopia.
- 20 October 1995 – a car bomb attack on police station in Rijeka, Croatia.
- 28 April 1996 – a mass shooting outside the Europa Hotel, Cairo, killing 17 Greek tourists mistaken for Israelis.
- 17 November 1997 – Luxor massacre at Deir el-Bahri, Luxor, Egypt. 58 foreign tourists and four Egyptians killed.

It was responsible for a variety of tourist shootings in middle and upper Egypt during the early 1990s. As a result of those attacks, cruise ships ceased sailing between Cairo and Luxor.

=== Renouncing terrorism ===
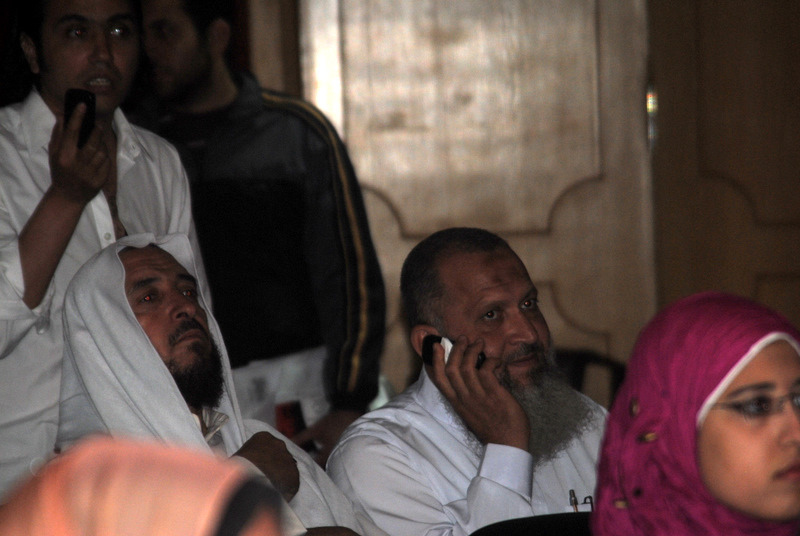
Members of al-Gamaa al-Islamiyya, 2011

After spending more than two decades in prison and discussions with Al-Azhar scholars, most of the leaders of al-Jamāʻah al-islāmīyah wrote several books renouncing their ideology of violence, some calling ex-Egyptian president Anwar Sadat, whom they assassinated, a martyr. al-Jamāʻah al-islāmīyah formally renounced bloodshed in 2003, and in September Egypt freed more than 1,000 members, citing what Interior Minister Habib el-Adli called the group's stated "commitment to rejecting violence." The Egyptian government and the unpopularity of the killing of foreign tourists have reduced the group's profile since the 2000s but the movement retained popular support among Egyptian Islamists who disapproved of the secular nature of Egypt's society and peace treaty with Israel.

In April 2006, the Egyptian government released approximately 1,200 members from prison, including a founder, Nageh Ibrahim. Reportedly, there have been "only two instances where members showed signs of returning to their former violent ways, and in both cases they were betrayed by informants within their own group."

=== 2011 revolution ===
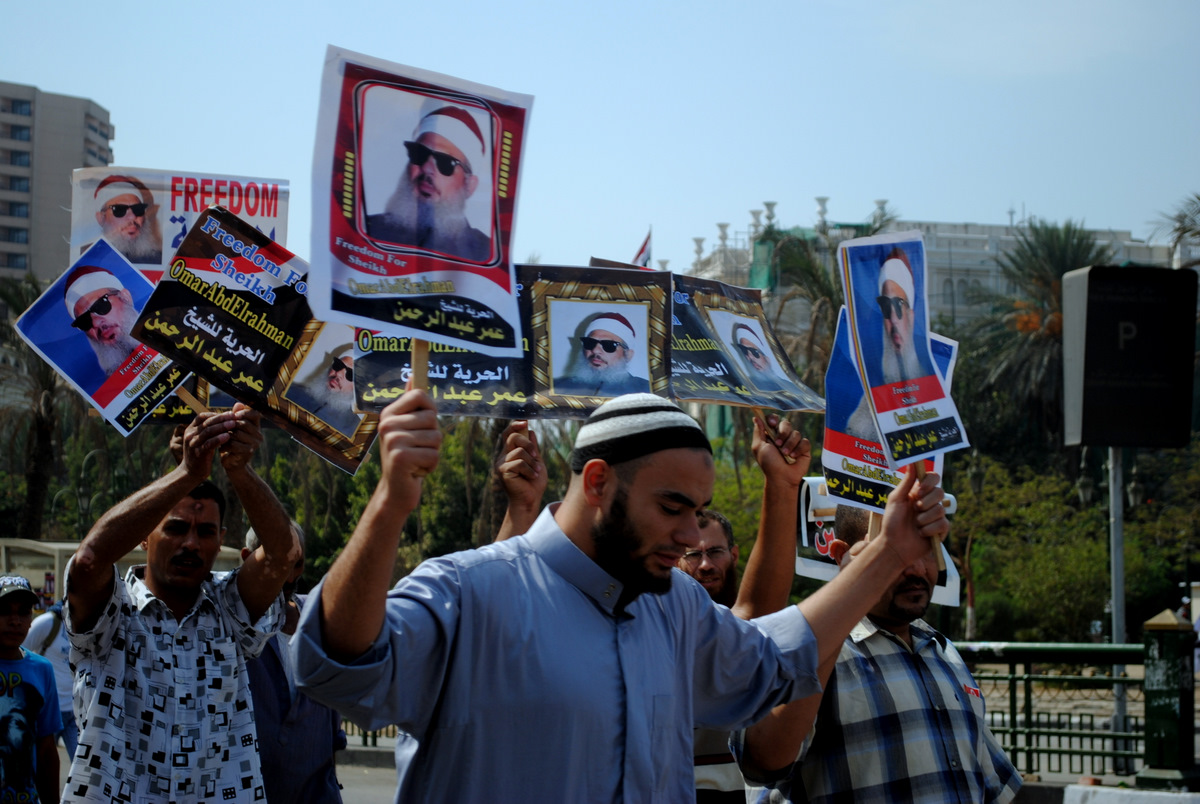
Supporters marching for Omar Abdel Rahman in 2011

Following the 2011 Revolution, al-Jamāʻah al-islāmīyah established a political party, the Building and Development Party. In August 2011, it presented 6,700 proxies (signatures) to the Egyptian political parties' committee on behalf of its party. In a statement the Jama'at said that any legislation drafted in Egypt after the revolution must refer to the sharia of God, "who blessed us with this revolution. We believe that the suffering we endured during the past years was due to neglecting religion and putting those who don't fear [God] in power." It stated that "Islam can contain everyone and respects the freedom of followers of other religions to refer to their own sharia in private affairs."

The Building and Development Party contested the 2011–2012 elections to the People's Council, the lower house of the Egyptian parliament, as part of the Islamic Alliance which was led by the salafi Al-Nour Party. It gained 13 seats: 12 in Upper Egypt and one in Suez. In June 2013, Egypt's president Mohammed Morsi appointed Adel el-Khayat, a member of the group, as governor of Luxor. el-Khayat resigned within a week of his appointment due to public unrest related to the group's commission of the 1997 massacre in Luxor.

== Beliefs ==
French political scientist Gilles Kepel found that the group repeatedly used the name of radical Islamist theorist Sayyid Qutb, and often quoted from his manifesto, Ma'alim fi al-Tariq (Milestones), in their leaflets and newsletters. They emphasized the right to legislate belongs to God alone; and that divine unity (tawhid) in Islam signifies liberation (tahrir) from all that is corrupt in thought – including the liberation of all that is inherited or conventional, like customs and traditions. Select writings from the group included the following assertions:

- Youth must be taught that Islam was nizam kamil wa shamil (a complete and perfect system) and must regulate government and war, the judicial system and the economy.
- The 1967 Arab–Israeli war was the result of Arab nationalism rather than the spread of Islam.
- The Islamic movement called for the wearing of veils by women and the white gallabieh and untrimmed beard by men, early marriage, and attendance at public prayers on the major Muslim festivals, Eid al-Fitr and Eid al-adha.

== Alliance with al-Qaeda ==
Deputy leader of al-Qaeda, Ayman al-Zawahiri, announced a new alliance with a faction of Al-Gama'a al-Islamiyya. In a video released on the internet on 5 August 2006. Zawahiri said "We bring good tidings to the Muslim nation about a big faction of the knights ofal-Jamāʻah al-islāmīyah uniting with Al-Qaeda," and the move aimed to help "rally the Muslim nation's capabilities in a unified rank in the face of the most severe crusader campaign against Islam in its history." An al-Jamāʻah al-islāmīyah leader, Muhammad al-Hukaymah, appeared in the video and confirmed the unity move. Hukaymah acknowledged that other al-Jamāʻah al-islāmīyah members had "backslid" from the militant course he was keeping to, and some al-Jamāʻah al-islāmīyah representatives denied that they were joining forces with the international Al-Qaeda network. Sheikh Abdel Akhar Hammad, a former al-Jamāʻah al-islāmīyah leader, told news agency Al-Jazeera: "If [some] brothers have joined, then this is their own personal view and I don't think that most al-Jamāʻah al-islāmīyah members share that same opinion."

== Foreign relations ==
Countries and organizations below have officially listed al-Jamāʻah al-islāmīyah as a terrorist organization.

Country	Date	References
United Kingdom	29 March 2001	
Canada	23 July 2002	
Israel	2003	
Russia	2006	
European Union	2001	
United Nations	2002	

== See also ==
- Terrorism in Egypt
- List of designated terrorist organizations
