= Hidroelektra workers massacre =

Mass killing of 12 people in Algeria

- Part of the Algerian Civil War
- Location: near Tamesguida, Algeria
- Date: 14 December 1993
- Target: Hidroelektra workers
- Attack type: Mass murder, terrorism
- Deaths: 12
- Injuries: 2
- Perpetrator: Armed Islamic Group of Algeria

The Hidroelektra workers massacre was the 1993 mass killing of 12 employees of the Croatian construction company Hidroelektra, which at the time was contracted to build a dam and a pipeline in Algeria.

== Background ==
SFR Yugoslavia and Algeria had friendly relations since the 1960s. The Yugoslav company Hidroelektra, headquartered in Zagreb, Croatia, acquired rights to construct a dam and a pipeline in Algeria, specifically near the city of Blida, to create a proper dam to supply power to the city. Workers from various parts of the constituent republics of Yugoslavia would arrive, especially those from SR Croatia and SR Bosnia and Herzegovina that were under contract of the company. They had relatively amicable relations with the Algerians.

Yugoslavia collapsed in 1991, and the Croatian War of Independence escalated by the end of the year. Following the December 1991 Algerian legislative election in which the Islamic Salvation Front won, the country descended into turmoil, and the Algerian Civil War started in early 1992. Several foreign nationals were killed and a Hidroelektra warehouse in Algeria was burnt down.

Meanwhile, the Bosnian War started, as well as the Croat–Bosniak War in late 1992. The Independent's reporting at the time said the attack may have been connected with the plight of Bosnian Muslims.

The Armed Islamic Group of Algeria demanded that all non-Muslim foreigners leave the country before 30 November 1993. In 1992 and 1993, the Islamist extremists in Algeria killed over 1,700 Algerians. In the first week of November 1993, four foreigners were killed, which triggered an exodus of foreign experts.

Hidroelektra workers lived in a camp near Médéa and Tamesguida at the time. On 14 December, most of the workers had already left the camp, except for a group of 22 men who were still there. The workers were near the end of a four-year contract and were due to leave Algeria in a few days.

== Massacre ==
In the evening of 14 December 1993, armed extremists stormed the camp where the workers resided.

According to a testimony from one of the survivors, the group of 50 assailants entered the camp through holes in the fence surrounding the encampment, sometime in the evening. The militants searched the barracks looking for workers and soon rounded up most of them. One worker remained hidden, while two workers were on a different location, thus avoiding the incident. They then tied up the workers and looted them.

Some of Hidroelektra's workers were Bosniaks, so the militants separated them from the rest of the group. They then tested the workers by asking them to pray in Arabic. Two of the Bosnian Croat workers successfully pretended that they were Muslims since they knew the prayers due to growing up alongside them.

One of the surviving workers recalled that after not knowing how to pray, he was taken to a different site where attackers threw him to the ground and slit his throat. He lost consciousness but remained alive as the executioner failed to cut his vital neck arteries. He claims that he pretended to be dead, but subsequently started to shiver due to shock. This resulted in an unknown person approaching him again and inflicting another deep cut, this time on the back side of his neck. Another worker had his face half-slashed, causing him to faint and making terrorists think that he was dead. Except for them, 12 other workers were put to death.

The surviving men were soon saved by the Algerian Army whose arrival routed the attackers. The injured men were then taken to a hospital where they received the necessary medical assistance.

== Aftermath ==
Following the massacre, the Croatian Government dispatched a delegation led by Ivo Sanader, who was at the time a Deputy Foreign Affairs Minister. This delegation brought the surviving workers back to Croatia, as well as human remains of those who were killed.

On 16 December, Sanader told the press that the visit to Algeria by Ejup Ganić, a member of the Presidency of Bosnia and Herzegovina, had something to do with the attack, but subsequent journalistic inquiries with diplomats from the area did not produce any evidence for that claim.
