= Mustafa Ahmed Hassan Hamza =

Egyptian revolutionary

Mustafa Hamza (born 1956) is an Egyptian commander of the military branch of the al-Jama'a al-Islamiyya. He was sentenced to death in absentia by an Egyptian court in the Returnees from Afghanistan case. It is believed he took part in the 1981 assassination of Egyptian President Anwar El Sadat, the attempted assassination of President Hosni Mubarak in Addis Ababa in June 1995. He was in Iran until May 2004, when he was extradited to Egypt. He was pardoned in 2012. In November 2017, Swiss TV reported that Mustafa Hamza is being held in Tora Prison and has been in detention for three years. His advocate, Adel Moawad, reportedly expected Hamza to be released in 2018 due to lack of evidence.

Hamza is also known to go by the aliases Abu Hazem, Mohamed Gamal El-Sayed, Mohamed Gamal El-Sayed Ali Khalil.
