= Tamesguida =

Tamesguida تمزقيدة
- Commune and town
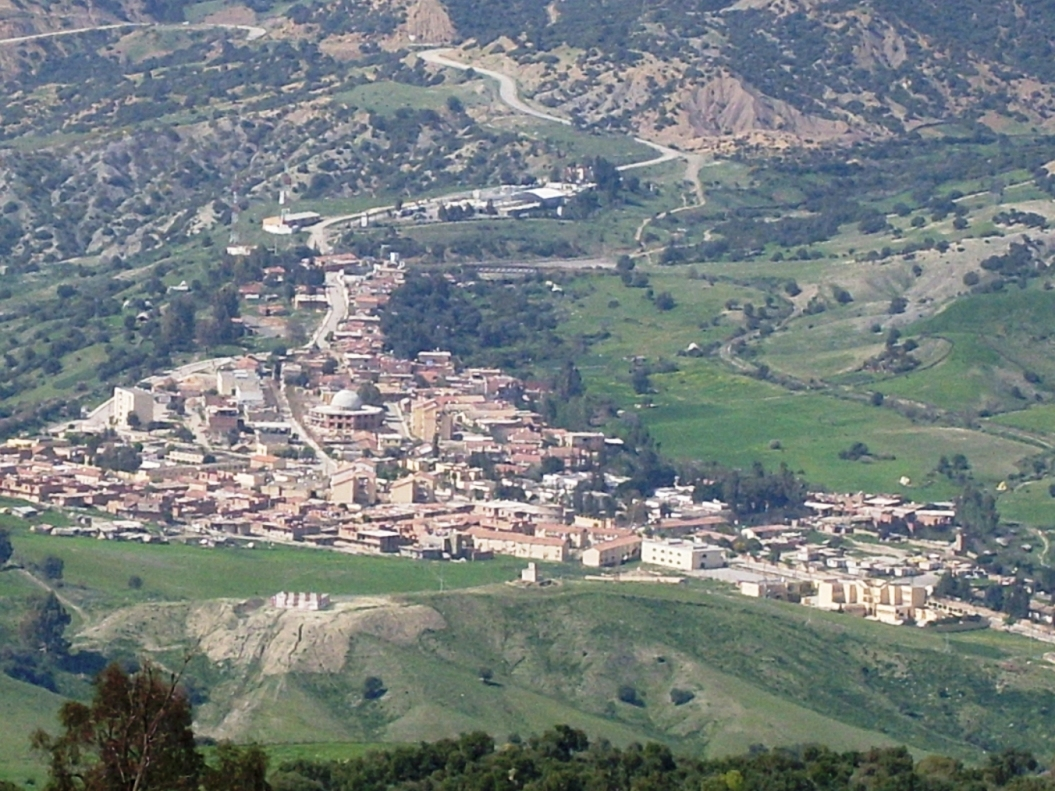

- Interactive map of Tamesguida
- Location within Algeria
- Coordinates: 36°19′26″N 2°41′22″E
- Country: Algeria
- Province: Médéa Province
- District: Médéa District

Area
  - Total: 38 sq mi (99 km^{2})

Population (2008)
  - Total: 4,591
- Time zone: UTC+1 (CET)

Tamesguida is a town and commune in Médéa Province, Algeria. According to the 1998 census, it has a population of 4,964. Tamesguida is situated at the bottom of Djebel Mouzaïa (altitude of 1,604m), 10 km north-west of Médéa City.

The Hidroelektra workers massacre in 1993 happened near Tamesguida.
