= Tal'at Fu'ad Qasim =

Egyptian Islamic terrorist

- Born: c. 1957; Nag Hammadi, Qena Governorate, Egypt
- Died: September 1995 (aged 38); Possibly executed place
- Cause of death: Execution by hanging (alleged)
- Other name: Abu Talal al-Qasimi
- Occupation: Leader of al-Jama'a al-Islamiyya
- Known for: Supposed abduction and likely execution

Tal'at Fu'ad Qasim (also spelled Qassim, Arabic: طلعت فؤاد قاسم; born c. 1957 Nag Hammadi Qena Governorate), also known as Abu Talal al-Qasimi (Arabic: أبو طلال القاسمي) (possibly executed in 1995), was the leader of Egypt's militant al-Jama'a al-Islamiyya (Gama'a Islamiyya) organization until he obtained political asylum in Denmark. He was executed in secret in 1995, following the first modern "extraordinary rendition" at the hands of U.S. authorities.

== Background ==
Qasim got his start in the Gama'a Islamiyya in the late 1970s, when he was head of the Student Union at Minya University in Upper Egypt; according to some sources, he was the immediate superior in the organization of Anwar Sadat's killer, Khalid Islambouli. He was arrested and imprisoned following the assassination, escaping after serving eight years in prison. He then joined the jihad against the Soviets in Afghanistan (actually operating from Peshawar, Pakistan); in 1989 he became head of the Gam'a Islamiyya. After being sentenced to death by an Egyptian security court, he obtained asylum in Denmark, despite his public espousal and embrace of terrorist violence against civilians.

== Capture and aftermath ==
In September 1995, he was kidnapped in Croatia during a trip to war-torn Bosnia. His capture was orchestrated by U.S. authorities, who had concluded that he posed a threat to U.S. interests. After questioning aboard a U.S. Navy vessel, he was handed over to Egyptian authorities in international waters.

Qasim, who had been tried and convicted in absentia by a military tribunal in 1992, was then apparently executed in secret by the Egyptian government, allegedly after torture. Early November news piece claimed "police continued to interrogate" him. The Egyptian government refused to acknowledge the detention and execution. According to Human Rights Watch, Qasim's was the first case of "extraordinary rendition"; predating by six years the September 11 terrorist attacks on New York and Washington.

In 2017, Qasim was removed from the US sanctions list twenty-two years after his death.
