= Gandhi Foundation =

The Gandhi Foundation is a United Kingdom-based voluntary organisation which seeks to further the work of Mahatma Gandhi through a variety of educational events and activities.

== Aims and activities ==
As part of its mission, the Gandhi Foundation focuses on promoting nonviolence as a remedy for war and aggression and egalitarian economics that emphasize self-reliance, cooperation, and trusteeship. The principal activities of the foundation are a quarterly newsletter and three annual events: a Multifaith Service, a Summer School, and an Annual Lecture. The newsletter is entitled "The Gandhi Way".

In 2008 the Gandhi Foundation helped to organise The Festival of Non-violence. As part of the festival the British Library unveiled a new travelling exhibition "The Life of Gandhi", with six 'panels' focusing on the following aspects of Gandhi's life and work: Non-violence and the influence of Jainism, Gandhi's work in South Africa, Gandhi's Philosophy, the Non-Cooperation and Quit India movements, and the independence of India.

== Gandhi International Peace Award ==
Recipients have included:

- 2001: Jubilee 2000 founders Martin Dent and Bill Peters.
- 2003: Denis Halliday, former UN Humanitarian Co-ordinator in Iraq. In his acceptance speech, he described Gandhi as one of his formative influences.
- 2004: Helen Steven and Ellen Moxley received the award in 2004 for their non-violent campaigning against weapons of mass destruction.
- 2007: Media Lens founders David Edwards and David Cromwell. Media Lens is a British media analysis website established in 2001 which criticises what the editors view as bias and omissions in the British media. In his acceptance speech, Cromwell cited Gandhi's maxim that "non-violence is the greatest force at the disposal of mankind".
- 2009: Coram Children's Legal Centre (CLC)
- 2010: The Parents Circle-Families Forum (PC-FF)
- 2011: Binayak Sen and Bulu Imam for their humanitarian work with India's Adivasis. The award was presented by Lord Bhikhu Parekh.
- 2012: St. John of Jerusalem Eye Hospital Group, for their humanitarian work.
- 2013: Jeremy Corbyn, for his "consistent efforts over a 30 year Parliamentary career to uphold the Gandhian values of social justice and non‐violence."
- 2014: Godric Bader and the Scott Bader Commonwealth, for "the alternative business model created by him and his family."
- 2015: Bike for Peace founders Tore Nærland and Frank Tomlinson.
- 2016: Peter Tatchell for his "consistent dedication over many decades in promoting human and gay rights".
- 2017: Ramzi Aburedwan and his organisation, Al Kamandjâti, which teaches music skills to children in the Occupied Palestinian territories and south Lebanon.
- 2018: Victoria Tauli-Corpuz and Roger Moody of Mines and Communities.
- 2022: Esther Trienekins of Action Village India.

== Annual Lecture ==
Lecturers, together with the title (or theme) of their lecture, are as follows:

- 1985: Johan Galtung. "Gandhi today".
- 1986: Jonathon Porritt. "Gandhi and the Green Movement".
- 1987: Martin Ennals. "The international concept of human rights".
- 1988: Paul Blau, Austrian Green Party. "The beginning of an epoch: time for the Great Peace Treaty".
- 1990: David Ennals. "Non-violence in international relations".
- 1991: Laxmi Mall Singhvi. "Gandhi today".
- 1992: Desmond Tutu. "Gandhi in South Africa".
- 1993: The Dalai Lama. "Compassion: the basis of non-violence".
- 1996: Donald Soper. "The total repudiation of mass violence as the only way to peace".
- 1997: Madhu Dandavate. "Gandhi's human touch".
- 1998: Mairead Maguire. "Building a culture of non-violence".
- 1999: Bruce Kent. "Time to abolish war".
- 2000: Adam Curle. "Mahatma Gandhi: the master of truth".
- 2001: Scilla Elworthy. "Gandhi's legacy: the vibrancy of non-violent conflict resolution in the 21st century".
- 2002: John Hume. "An eye for an eye".
- 2003: Simon Hughes. "India and Gandhi: their legacy to London".
- 2004: Helen Steven and Ellen Moxley, founders of The Scottish Centre for Nonviolence. "Our world at the crossroads: non-violence or non-existence".
- 2005: Mark Tully. "Was the Mahatma too great a soul? Pulling Gandhi off his pedestal".
- 2006: Kamalesh Sharma. "Encounters with Gandhi".
- 2007: Bhikhu Parekh. "Why is Gandhi still relevant?".
- 2008: Harold Good. "The essentials of peaceful conflict resolution".
- 2009: Aftab Alam. "The role of the Indian Supreme Court in upholding secularism in India".
- 2011: Anthony Parel. "Pax Gandhiana: Is Gandhian non-violence compatible with the coercive state?".
- 2013: Vince Cable. "What would a Gandhian business model look like? and what steps would a LibDem Government take to get there".
- 2014: Navichandra Ramgoolam. "The rule of law and nation building".
- 2016: Rowan Williams. "Empathy, ethics and peacemaking: reflections on preserving our humanity".
- 2017: Satish Kumar. "Gandhi for the 21st century".
- 2019: Gopalkrishna Gandhi. "Atonement in politics. Perspectives from Gandhi".
- 2020: Graeme Nuttall. "EO v3.0 – Employee ownership with added Gandhian purpose". (delivered online)
- 2022: Alexandre Christoyannopoulos. "Peacefully preventing and stopping war: Some challenges to conventional wisdom".
- 2023: Paul Bazely. "Becoming Gandhi".

In some years there has not been a lecture. In 1989 and 2010 there were panel discussions instead of a lecture.
