= Why Are We the Good Guys? =

2012 book by David Cromwell

Why Are We The Good Guys?: Reclaiming Your Mind from the Delusions of Propaganda
- Author: David Cromwell
- Language: English
- Subjects: Foreign policy, Western world, Human rights
- Published: Winchester
- Publisher: Zero Books
- Publication date: 2012
- Publication place: United Kingdom
- Media type: Print
- Pages: 316
- ISBN: 9781780993652
- Dewey Decimal: 320.5

Why Are We The Good Guys?: Reclaiming Your Mind from the Delusions of Propaganda is a 2012 book by British media campaigner and author David Cromwell, co-editor of the Media Lens website.

== Background ==
Making use of the propaganda model developed by Edward S. Herman and Noam Chomsky, Cromwell is critical of the inherent assumption that the Western world is superior, and a great defender of human rights. The book analyses standard accounts on "foreign policy, climate change and the constant struggle between state-corporate power and genuine democracy". The book discusses US manipulation of the British Government to prevent nationalisation of industry, the Iraq War and the media's reaction to it and makes accusations of Western hypocrisy, particularly over Iran. The book is strongly critical of the failure of the mainstream media to hold power to account, whether government, military or corporate. Cromwell is the co-editor of the Media Lens website, and part of the book discusses the founding of Media Lens in 2001 and the struggle to publish independent journalism.

== Reception ==
In Peace News Pascal Ansell praised the book commending the "powerful examples" of its arguments. It received a mixed review in Red Pepper, with the reviewer Richard Goulding observing that "sometimes eye-opening information is uncovered". He criticised the author for not considering the rape allegations made against Julian Assange while Cromwell accuses the media of attempting to "silence or vilify" the Wikileaks founder. The book was also reviewed by the Morning Star and the Southern Daily Echo.
