= Media Lens =

British media analysis website

- Screenshot from Media Lens (22 March 2013)
- Website type: Media analysis
- Available in: English
- Editors: David Cromwell and David Edwards
- Website: www.medialens.org
- Registration: None
- Launched: 2001; 25 years ago

Media Lens is a British media analysis website established in 2001 by David Cromwell and David Edwards. Cromwell and Edwards are the site's editors and only regular contributors. Their aim is to scrutinise and question the mainstream media's coverage of significant events and issues and to draw attention to what they consider "the systemic failure of the corporate media to report the world honestly and accurately".

Media Lens is financed by donations from website visitors. The editors issue regular "Media Alerts" concentrating on mainstream media outlets, such as the BBC and Channel 4 News, which are legally obliged to be impartial, or on outlets such as The Guardian, or The Independent, which are usually considered left-leaning. The site's editors frequently draw attention to what they see as the limits within which the mainstream media operates, and provide "a riveting exposé of the myth of liberal media based on a variety of empirical case studies", according to Graham Murdock and Michael Pickering.

Media Lens is admired by John Pilger, who has called the website "remarkable" and described the writers as "the cyber guardians of honest journalism". Other journalists, in particular Peter Oborne, have also made positive comments about the group, although it has come into conflict with other journalists. The Observer's foreign editor Peter Beaumont asserted that the group ran a "campaign" against John Sloboda and the Iraq Body Count for underestimating the number of deaths in Iraq. George Monbiot wrote that Media Lens was "belittling the acts of genocide" in their defence of Edward S. Herman, who had questioned the number of deaths in the Srebrenica massacre.

== Foundation and influences ==
David Edwards and David Cromwell of Media Lens receive the Gandhi Foundation Peace Award, 2 December 2007

By the late 1990s, David Edwards had concluded that there was a "media suppression of the truth about the effect of the sanctions" against Iraq, and an indifference to climate change: "the media were still celebrating the idea that Britain might soon be blessed with a Mediterranean climate". Another motivation came from interviewing Denis Halliday, former head of the UN's humanitarian aid program, after concluding its actions in Iraq were "genocidal". Meanwhile, David Cromwell had found coverage of certain issues to be "paltry", and had gained a negligible response from the newspapers to which he had written. The two men first met in 1999, and Edwards suggested beginning a collaborative website.

Central to Media Lens analysis is the Propaganda model, first developed by Edward Herman and Noam Chomsky, in their book Manufacturing Consent (1988). The theory posits that the way in which news media is structured (through advertising, media ownership, government sourcing and others) creates an inherent conflict of interest which leads to systemic bias and propaganda for undemocratic forces. Edwards has also cited Erich Fromm, who thought "a society that subordinates people and planet to profit is inherently insane and toxic", and his practice of Buddhism as influences.

Media Lens has expressed admiration for Australian born journalist John Pilger on several occasions. Around 2006, Media Lens said The Guardian would not publish Pilger "because he's honest about the media" and "draws attention to the vital role of the entire liberal media establishment in crimes against humanity. So he is persona non grata". In a 2007 interview, Media Lens said Pilger was a "huge inspiration" and, while discussing his work in the mainstream media, stated that "on the one hand, his work has a tremendous effect in enlightening a lot of people. On the other hand, his work is used to strengthen the propaganda system's false claims of honesty and openness".

Writing in Z Communications in May 2014, Elliot Murphy said that Media Lens pay careful attention to the writings of George Orwell, "noting the prevalence of clichés which should arouse suspicion in any reader of the press or listener of parliamentary debates. These include 'at a time when', 'demands difficult choices', 'pivotal moment', 'towards', 'inextricably linked', 'courage', 'human being', 'some people say that', 'left of centre', and 'history tells us'. Cromwell and Edwards observe that 'it is not important to make sense in the media; it is important only to be able to bandy the jargon of media discourse in a way that suggests in-depth knowledge: Iran-Contra, IMF, G8, the "roadmap to peace", "UN resolution 1441", and so on' ".

== Activities and main arguments ==
In 2001, Media Lens began issuing regular online Media Alerts, scrutinising media coverage, the arguments used, source selection, and the framing of events to highlight bias, omissions and direct lies. The media alerts are distributed without charge by email to an international readership. According to Media Lens, the readership was around 14,000 people in 2009. Funding is through reader subscriptions and donations. The editors engage in email and Twitter exchanges with British journalists and editors. They also invite their readers to challenge journalists, editors and programme producers directly via email, specifically discouraging abusive contact.

According to Cromwell and Edwards, journalists in the mainstream media articulate an "'official' version of events ... as Truth. The testimony of critical observers and participants" and "especially those on the receiving end of Western firepower – are routinely marginalised, ignored and even ridiculed". The editors "reject all conspiracy theories. Instead, we point to the inevitably corrupting effects of 'market forces' operating on, and through, media corporations seeking profit in a society dominated by corporate power ... Media employees are part of a corporate system that, unsurprisingly, selects for servility to the needs and goals of corporate power". They believe that mainstream journalists gradually absorb an unquestioning corporate mindset as their careers progress, becoming unwilling to question their occupations or governments claims, but not consciously lying. They also say that the limitations of the corporate media are not unexpected as "[w]e did not expect the Soviet Communist Party's newspaper Pravda to tell the truth about the Communist Party, why should we expect the corporate press to tell the truth about corporate power?"

In Cromwell and Edwards' opinion, Western government actions have followed an "historical pattern of deception" going back several centuries, and "the corporate media is the source of some of the greatest, most lethal illusions of our age". Edwards wrote that, because of these corporate distortions, "we believe, society is not told the truth about the appalling consequences of corporate greed for poor people in the Third World, and for the environment". According to Cromwell and Edwards, the centre-left wing of the mainstream media are gatekeepers "of acceptable debate from a left or Green perspective, 'thus far and no further'", and that dissenting views have difficulty gaining attention in a corporate system. They have contrasted positive comments the mainstream media make about Western leaders, with the epithets used to describe politicians such as Hugo Chávez, Venezuela's former President. In 2013, Media Lens described the corporate media as "an extremist fringe" from which progressives should completely dissociate themselves.

In May 2011, and more extensively in January 2015, Media Lens advocated "a collective of high-profile writers and journalists willing to detach themselves from corporate and state media, and to place themselves entirely at the mercy of the public" with their output freely available "from a single media outlet" and financed by donations. "The support would be vast, if the initiative was posited as an alternative to the biocidal, corruption-drenched corporate media", they said in an interview with The Colossus website in January 2016. Cromwell wrote in 2016 that, to find coverage of the Yemeni Civil War, "[n]ot unusually, one has to go to media such as" the Russian television network RT and the Iranian news network Press TV, which are "so often bitterly denigrated as 'propaganda' operations by corporate journalists".

== Reception ==
In December 2002, eighteen months after the site's creation, Australian journalist John Pilger described Media Lens as "becoming indispensable". In a New Internationalist interview in 2010, Pilger said Media Lens "has broken new ground with the first informed and literate analysis and criticism of the liberal media". Regarding their work on the invasion and occupation of Iraq and Afghanistan, he wrote that "Without [Media Lens'] meticulous and humane analysis, the full gravity of the debacles of Iraq and Afghanistan might have been consigned to bad journalism's first draft of bad history". In a 2007 article about them, John Pilger mentioned their first collaborative book, Guardians of Power (2006), and wrote that "not a single national newspaper reviewed the most important book about journalism I can remember", including the left-wing Morning Star. The Morning Star did review their second book, Newspeak In The 21st Century, in 2009.

Peter Barron, former editor of the BBC's Newsnight commented in 2005: "In fact I rather like them. David Cromwell and David Edwards, who run the site, are unfailingly polite, their points are well-argued and sometimes they're plain right." In June 2006, Peter Beaumont wrote in The Observer that Media Lens "insist that the only acceptable version of the truth is theirs alone and that everybody else should march to the same step", and described them as "controlling Politburo lefties". He likened the group's email campaigns to "a train spotters' club run by Uncle Joe Stalin". Media Lens responded that "Beaumont was unwilling to challenge even one of the thousands of arguments and facts published in 2,000 pages of Media Alerts and in our book Guardians Of Power – so, instead, our 'nastiness' was the focus of attention".

The journalist Peter Wilby, wrote in January 2006 that "their basic critique is correct" and he occasionally commissioned Cromwell and Edwards while he was editor of the New Statesman. He also wrote that "the Davids are virtually unknown; as leftist critics, they are marginalised." Writing in The Guardian in July 2008, Wilby described Media Lens as "formidably researched. It avoids easy targets, such as the Mail and Sun, and criticises the Guardian, Independent, Times and Telegraph, arguing the "liberal media" isn't as liberal as it thinks it is. Edwards and Cromwell might be described as early examples of citizen journalists".

In his 2007 book The Triumph of the Political Class, journalist Peter Oborne wrote that while researching media coverage of the Iraq war, he had found the site "extremely useful". Media Lens are "often unfair but sometimes highly perceptive". On 2 December 2007, Edwards and Cromwell were awarded the Gandhi International Peace Award. The award was presented by Denis Halliday, the former United Nations Humanitarian Co-ordinator in Iraq, and himself a recipient of the award in 2003. Oliver Boyd-Barrett, an academic specialising in Communications Studies, said in 2010 that Media Lens possess a "relentless commitment" to assessing the media "on criteria of rationality and humanity, for what they write and fail to write, and doing so in a tone that is determinedly polite and respectful, even when the content is highly critical".

In February 2011, John Rentoul wrote about his interactions with what he called Media Lens "adherents". He said an email exchange,

"may continue until journalist is too busy to reply or until the snarl of Chomskian-Pilgerism is unwittingly betrayed and journalist realises he or she has not been engaging with a reasonable person. At this point, Media Lens adherent then posts the email chain on the sect's website, without notice or permission [beginning a thread]. This is supposed to embarrass the apologist for the corporate media/torture/Tony Blair and expose him to ridicule by other sect members".

In January 2012, The Guardian's Michael White, accused Media Lens of suggesting the newspaper's two most left-wing writers, Milne and George Monbiot "trim their sails and pull their punches to accommodate their paymasters". He added: "Media Lens doesn't do subtle. Nor do its more acceptable heroes, such as John Pilger or [The Independent's] Robert Fisk". Media Lens responded that corporate journalists did more than merely "trim sails". There were "whole areas of thought and discussion are demonstrably off the agenda" and "the corporate nature of the mass media tends to produce performance that defends and furthers the goals of the corporate system". In May 2016, White wrote that their work suggests "their own editing priorities may be as partisan and un-self-aware as the corporates they so severely condemn".

In February 2012, the philosopher Rupert Read criticised Media Lens' use of Michel Chossudovsky and articles by Robert Dreyfuss and Aisling Byrne as sources for the situation in Syria. In May 2014, Elliot Murphy wrote in ZNet that Media Lens "have carefully exposed the shortcomings and lies of the press" and "their Alerts are invariably well researched, well argued, and often entertaining". He described their book Guardians of Power: The Myth of the Liberal Media as a brilliant assessment of the "balance of reporting when it comes to 'our' crimes versus 'theirs'". He criticised them for generally confining their suggested actions to email campaigns rather than "direct action, non-violent civil disobedience, or even the odd promotion of an upcoming rally or lecture" and suggested that they "rethink their tactics when trying to influence, typically through electronic means, the actions and thoughts of other political writers and their general readership". Regarding Media Lens' criticism of left-wing sources, Murphy wrote: "Writing detailed critiques of corporate media reports is admirable, but isolating yourself from those who could not only help you out, but who may in fact also need your help in undermining the very corporate media forces you're attempting to expose as fundamentally subservient to power, is not the action of an organisation trying to improve the world".

In August 2015, Helen Lewis, deputy editor of the New Statesman wrote about an interview she had with Yvette Cooper. Media Lens messaged Lewis on twitter asking why she had not mentioned that Cooper had voted in favour of wars that "wrecked" Iraq and Libya. Media Lens said that Lewis did not reply but New Statesman columnist Sarah Ditum wrote an article in which she said Media Lens are "largely engaged in an endless project of separating the anti-war sheep from the goats to be purged". In response to Ditum, Edwards wrote: "Cooper's voting record of course has grave implications for the near-certainty of future wars waged on more states around the world. Any reasonable commentator understands the need to pay careful attention to the candidates' record and thinking on war". David Wearing, writing in openDemocracy in September 2015, commented that while the group has "a vocal, dedicated following", it also has "a long record of alienating potential allies with their purity tests and aggressive oversimplifications".

In February 2016, Oliver Kamm described Media Lens as a "far-left pressure group" who are "doughty defenders of Venezuela's revolutionary regime". In March 2016, journalist Owen Jones wrote that the editors' "attack me with even more force than writers who actually defend the status quo. Those writers confirm their analysis, after all: my presence disrupts it, and therefore I'm actually arguably worse", accusing them of "once tweeting a paragraph I wrote summing up the arguments of those who attacked critics of Obama, and pretending those arguments were what I actually thought". Padraig Reidy wrote in an August 2016 piece for Little Atoms, that Media Lens "is only ever asking questions it thinks it already knows the answer to". When one of the Media Lens' editors suggested on twitter in 2018 that young writers should "follow your bliss" (a term coined by the American writer Joseph Campbell) and contribute "what you absolutely love to write to inspire and enlighten other people" rather than bothering about prestige or financial reward, extensive responses were posted on the social media platform. Journalist James Ball responded that writers should try the mainstream first to gain attention for their work as "virtually all of the best journalism comes out of 'corporate' or 'mainstream' media", such as the parliamentary expenses scandal, "the exposure of offshore leaks", "Iraq War Logs", "Libor rigging", and "dozens of other major pieces of accountability stories".

== Case histories ==
=== Iraq ===
==== Justification for war ====
In 2002, prior to the Iraq War, Media Lens argued that it was fraudulent for the UK and US governments to justify a war on the basis that Iraq still possessed a credible Weapons of Mass Destruction (WMD) threat and had an active WMD programme. Media Lens cited the work of former chief UN arms inspector Scott Ritter, who had stated 4 years previously that a thorough investigation by UN inspectors had found that Iraq had "fundamentally disarmed" with 90–95 per cent of its WMD capability eliminated. Media Lens further cited Ritter's opinion that it would have been impossible for Iraq to rearm "from scratch" within the four years since the UN had left, given the level of scrutiny they were under.

A 30 April 2003 Media Lens database search, covering the period leading up to and including the invasion of Iraq found that, of the 5,767 articles published by The Guardian and its sister paper The Observer, only twelve made any mention of Scott Ritter. According to Edwards, this constituted "a shocking suppression of serious and credible dissident views", which he said were "soon to be entirely vindicated". Eddie Girdner agreed with Media Lens and cited it as one of the few who had drawn this conclusion before the war began.

According to Richard Alexander, writing in 2010 about the Iraq war, Edwards and Cromwell "trenchantly dissected the servant role the British media played in bolstering the lies to the British public purveyed by the UK government". After referring to the "mountain of evidence" assembled by Cromwell and Edwards for their argument, John Jewell wrote for The Conversation website: "It must be remembered that the press was not completely united in its support for Blair" pointing to the opposition of the Daily Mirror to the invasion of Iraq as an example. Jewell's assertion about the "anti-war" Mirror was not entirely shared by Media Lens who criticised its respect for Blair's "patent sincerity". Nick Robinson in Live From Downing Street (2012), refers to an exchange between Media Lens and then Head of BBC News Richard Sambrook in late 2002 a few months before the invasion of Iraq:

"[W]e believe you are a sincere and well-intentioned person ... but you are at the heart of a system of lethal, institutionalised deception. Like it or not, believe it or not, by choosing to participate in this propaganda system, you and the journalists around you may soon be complicit in mass murder. As things stand, you and your journalists are facilitating the killing and mutilation of thousands, perhaps hundreds of thousands, of innocent men, women and children".

Robinson responded to this argument: "It is absurd – not to mention offensive – to suggest that journalists who report both the case for war and the case against it are morally responsible for those who die in it".

==== Reporting of conflict ====
In 2003, Media Lens compared the BBC's reporting on the Iraq war to "Boys' Own war pornography". They cited a rhetorical question posed by BBC correspondent Bridget Kendall in 2006, about whether the Iraq war was "justified" or a "disastrous miscalculation" as a demonstration of personal bias, and not meeting the requirement for reporting to be impartial. In their opinion, Kendall's question excluded the view, held by the anti-war movement and ex-UN secretary general Kofi Annan, that the war was "an illegal war of aggression".

Media Lens cited comments made by Andrew Marr in 2003, while he was the BBC's political editor, in support of their argument that journalists regularly present inflated assessments of the accomplishments of western politicians. They considered Marr to be overtly sympathetic to Tony Blair. In 2003, Cromwell and Edwards said that "there never was an Iraqi threat" and "If Tony Blair and George W. Bush are not guilty of war crimes, who is?"

==== Casualty figures ====
Media Lens has challenged the mainstream media coverage of the effect of the 2003 invasion of Iraq and subsequent occupation on the Iraqi mortality rate.

===== The Lancet surveys =====
The Lancet published two peer-reviewed studies of the effect of the 2003 invasion and occupation on the Iraqi mortality rate at two separate points in time. Both surveys used recognised statistical methods. The first survey was published in 2004 and estimated an excess death rate of 100,000 Iraqis as a result of the invasion and occupation of Iraq up to that time. The second Lancet survey, published in 2006, estimated that, as at the end of June 2006, 655,000 more deaths had occurred since the invasion, than would have been expected in the absence of conflict. The 2004 Lancet survey was discussed by mathematician John Allen Paulos in an article published in The Guardian. Following criticism of the article by Media Lens, Paulos acknowledged he had been wrong to use a "largely baseless personal assessment", to call into question the findings of The Lancet study.

In 2005, Media Lens challenged The Independent's senior leader writer on foreign affairs, Mary Dejevsky, to explain why an editorial in the paper said the results of the 2004 Lancet study were obtained "by extrapolating from a small sample" and that "[w]hile never completely discredited, those figures were widely doubted". Dejevsky responded that, while the sample may have been standard, it seemed small from her "lay perspective". Her main point "was less based on my impression than on the fact that this technique exposed the authors to the criticisms/dismissal that the govt duly made, and they had little to counter those criticisms with, bar the defence that their methods were standard for those sort of surveys". The response was considered incoherent by Edward Herman who called it "Massive incompetence in support of a war-apologetic agenda". According to Mukhopadhyay, the exchange was evidence that journalists, who do not have the statistical expertise to evaluate technical reports, "do not always take the obvious step of seeking expert advice". Reviewing Media Lens' engagement with press coverage of The Lancet study, Arvind Sivaramakrishna drew a similar conclusion stating, "Political correspondents are clearly ignorant of sampling frames and techniques, confidence limits, significance levels, likelihood estimators, and so on."

The 2004 survey findings were described as exaggerated and flawed by the US and UK governments which cited a much lower figure, a position which was largely supported in US and UK media coverage. Media Lens said the media "fell into line" with the governments' view despite earlier accepting the estimates from a similar study by the same researchers, using the same methods, which had estimated 1.7 million deaths in the Congo.

===== The Iraq Body Count =====
The Iraq Body Count project (IBC) was set up by Hamit Dardagan and John Sloboda as an attempt to record civilian deaths resulting from the US-led 2003 invasion of Iraq. Project volunteers examined news stories for reports of civilian casualties. Each incident reported by at least by two independent news sources was included in a database. As at the middle of 2006, the IBC study estimated between 38,725 and 43,140 civilian deaths arising from the 2003 invasion.

Starting in January 2006, Media Lens began examining the IBC project. Its criticisms were that IBC results were not produced by experts in epidemiology and were not peer reviewed, unlike the two Lancet surveys. They also said that studies similar to that of the IBC had been found to only capture a fraction of actual deaths. The lower count produced by the IBC's method was, Media Lens argued, used by politicians and journalists "particularly of the pro-war variety" (they named Herald Sun journalist Adam Bolt(sic) and the Liberal Democrats as their examples) to "downplay the tragedy of the civilian death toll" and "suggest, for example, that the results of the invasion have been far less severe than the consequences of leaving Saddam Hussein in power".

In April 2006, David Fuller, a BBC Newsnight journalist, wrote about Media Lens' four campaigns against the IBC project's methods on the BBC website. The Media Lens editors refused two invitations to appear on Newsnight as they did not believe they would be treated fairly on the programme. In response Fuller accused them of "[refusing] to engage in any way that does not allow them total control of the interaction". In an interview with Fuller, Sloboda said Media Lens was "a pressure group that use[s] aggressive and emotionally destructive tactics". He acknowledged that Iraq Body Count were "amateurs" but stated this did not have any negative connotations for their work. Also in April, Iraq Body Count published a paper defending its work against criticism. It described the criticism of Media Lens and others as "inaccurate and exaggerated, personal, offensive, and part of a concerted campaign to undermine IBC's reputation among those who use our data".

In June 2006, Peter Beaumont, foreign affairs editor for The Observer newspaper, accused the Media Lens editors' of a "campaign apparently designed to silence" John Sloboda and the Iraq Body Count project, because it produced a victim count lower than The Lancet study.

=== Srebrenica: Chomsky and others ===
On 31 October 2005, The Guardian newspaper published an interview with Noam Chomsky conducted by Emma Brockes. Chomsky complained about the interview in a letter to the readers' editor, Ian Mayes, on 3 November 2005, after which Media Lens responded with their first article on this issue on 4 November. Within a few weeks, The Guardian apologised to Chomsky for three significant errors in the story including that Brockes had misrepresented Chomsky's views on the Srebrenica massacre and the nature of his support for Diana Johnstone. The Guardian also wrote that "[n]either Prof Chomsky nor Ms Johnstone have ever denied the fact of the massacre". Media Lens responded to The Guardian's apology in a second article posted on 21 November. The repercussions of the Brockes interview continued for some time. Ian Mayes, then the readers' editor of The Guardian, wrote on 12 December 2005 that he and Brockes had received "several hundred" emails from Media Lens followers, who were protesting about Chomsky's treatment.

In December 2009, Media Lens removed Edward S. Herman and David Peterson's article, Open Letter To Amnesty International from its site. It explained to its readers that the removal was in response to "ill-tempered" comments from some readers and to avoid "publishing defamatory statements from either side". Soon after, Kamm wrote in his blog for The Times newspaper that the article Media Lens had removed repeated false claims about Serb-run detention camps in Bosnia which had led in 2000 to a successful libel action brought against LM magazine (originally Living Marxism) by ITN.

In 2009, Media Lens summarised Herman and Peterson's articles on Srebrenica by saying that, although Herman and Peterson were "not denying that mass killings took place at Srebrenica", they "do not accept the figure cited by Kamm and others, but that they are perfectly entitled to do". In June 2011, George Monbiot wrote that Media Lens "maintained that Herman and Peterson were 'perfectly entitled' to talk down the numbers killed at Srebrenica". He also wrote that Herman and Media Lens had taken "the unwarranted step of belittling the acts of genocide committed by opponents of the western powers". In response, Media Lens said their argument had been that Herman and Peterson were "perfectly entitled" to debate the facts not that "they are entitled to falsify, mislead, wilfully deceive, or whatever 'talk down' was intended to suggest". They also wrote that journalists reporting on the effects of the Iraq war were not accused of 'genocide denial' if they chose to use the IBC's estimate of 100,000 deaths over the Lancet study's estimate of 655,000 Iraqi dead in 2006. They said "typically, someone is adjudged guilty of 'genocide denial' only when they question accounts of crimes committed by official enemies of the West". Regarding the use of the term 'genocide' they wrote:

To be clear, we reject the right of any court, any government, indeed anyone, to apply labels like "genocide" to historical events and then, not merely argue but demand that they be accepted. The assumption that human institutions are in possession of Absolute Truth belongs to the era of The Inquisition, not to serious debate.

Kamm wrote in October 2012: "The International Commission on Missing Persons (ICMP) has revealed the identity of 6,598 people missing since the fall of Srebrenica, through DNA analysis of human remains in mass graves. It estimates the total number of victims as around 8,100. If ML maintains that deniers [Herman and Peterson] are 'perfectly entitled' to their position, it must believe that the ICMP has faked that analysis". In his opinion, Media Lens "stands with genocide deniers" in its connection with Herman and his colleague, David Peterson, both of whom he linked in their statements about Srebrenica with Holocaust deniers.

=== Syria ===
Rupert Read, an academic and Green Party politician said that Media Lens tends to talk up the numbers of victims of western actions but minimise those of governments in conflict with the west, such as those of Bashar al-Assad in Syria and Slobodan Milošević. He described the articles by Aisling Byrne and Robert Dreyfuss, which Media Lens had used as sources for fatalities in the conflicts in Syria, as "dubious". He said the effect of this is "tacitly to increase the credibility of Assad's black propaganda". David Edwards responded that there was already enough media coverage of the "crimes of official enemies" which, he said, tended to empower the "US-UK war machine". He said Media Lens preferred to "challenge the false assumption of US-UK benevolent intentions, the hypocrisy in media reporting, and the belief that war is the only alternative".

In May 2012, Media Lens had an exchange on twitter with cartoonist and writer Martin Rowson. Rowson had published a cartoon after the Houla massacre depicting a bloodstained Bashar al-Assad. The cartoon also depicted "Angela Merkel and Christine Lagarde lashing a pile of human bones with euro-laden cats-o'-nine-tails". Media Lens asked Rowson what evidence about the massacre he had used in drawing his cartoon. When Rowson replied that he had "no more evidence than media & UN reports, like anyone else. Also used cartoonist's hunch", Media Lens asked whether he would "rely on a "hunch" in depicting Obama and Cameron with mouths smeared with the blood of massacred children?" Tribune magazine published an article by Howson about the exchange in which he asked why Media Lens had not sought his "evidence for alleging that Merkel and Lagarde have really truly desecrated corpses, as depicted in my cartoon". He said one possible reason was they were "shilling for tyrants".

In February 2017, Media Lens compared the media coverage of comments made on Syria by Jeremy Corbyn's spokesperson Seumas Milne in October 2016 with the coverage of UK foreign secretary Boris Johnson's comments in January 2017. Media Lens wrote that Johnson's change in policy, announced in January 2017, to accept that President Bashar al-Assad should be allowed to stand for election and remain in power, was the result of newly elected President Trump's opposition to Obama's war for regime change in Syria. They said Milne's comments were "not defending Assad, merely calling for greater attention to US-UK atrocities". They described the media reaction as "ferocious criticism of Milne's innocuous comments and the complete absence of any criticism of Johnson's policy shift". According to them, the reason for the difference was that "the corporate media system is ideologically aligned against an authentically left-wing Labour leader, is working to undermine his reputation, and to protect the reputation of the Conservative government". Media Lens described the media's "supposed compassion for the Syrian people" as "manufactured, fake".

In June 2017, the German newspaper Die Welt published an article by Seymour Hersh in which he said the attack by the Syrian government at Khan Shaykhun in April 2017 did not involve sarin and that US intelligence knew this. Hersh wrote that his sources said the attack struck a building which housed "fertilisers, disinfectants and other goods". Media Lens tweeted that their search of a newspaper database showed no mention of Hersh's report. In June 2017, journalist Brian Whitaker criticised Media Lens for being unconcerned that Hersh had not provided the sources for his story. Whitaker wrote that Media Lens had previously criticised The Guardian for quoting "unnamed American officials" in a story about Iraq.

== See also ==
- Casualties of the Iraq War
- Fairness and Accuracy in Reporting
- Media coverage of climate change
- Media Matters for America
