= Denis Halliday =

Irish diplomat

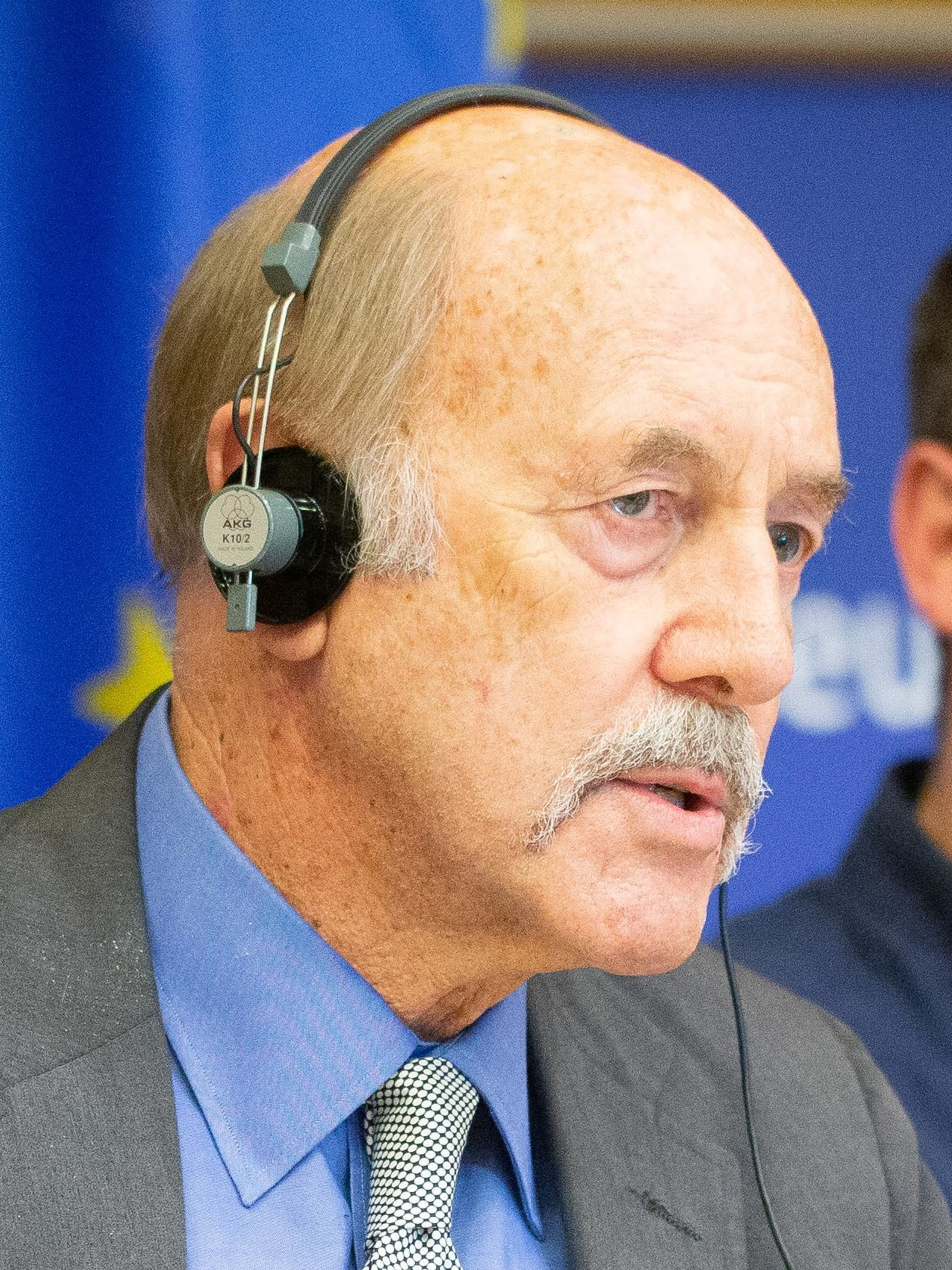
Denis Halliday (2019)

Denis J. Halliday (c.1941-2026) was an Irish diplomat who served as the United Nations Humanitarian Coordinator in Iraq from 1 September 1997 until 1998. He had served earlier as the Deputy Resident Representative to Singapore of the United Nations Development Programme. He died in Dublin on 11 October 2026.

== Education and early career ==
Halliday graduated from Trinity College, Dublin, with a MA in Economics, Geography and Public Administration. He spent a year in Kenya as a Quaker volunteer from 1962 to 1963, before joining United Nations in 1964.

== UN career ==
Halliday's first posting was in Tehran as a junior professional officer in the United Nations Technical Assistance Board and Special Fund. From 1966 to 1972, he served in the Asian Bureau of the UNDP Headquarters in New York and then in Malaysia from 1972 to 1977 as Deputy Regional Representative. Moving to Indonesia, he continued as Deputy Regional Representative until 1979, when he moved to Samoa as Resident Representative covering Samoa, the Cook Islands, the Tokelau Islands and Niue in the South Pacific. Returning to New York in 1981, he served in the Asia and Pacific Bureau and in 1985 became the Deputy Director, Division of Personnel and Chef de Cabinet in 1987. In 1985, he took up the post of Deputy Director, Division of Personnel before becoming Chef de Cabinet, Office of the Administrator of the UNDP from 1987 to 1989. He served as the Director, Division of Personnel of the UNDP from 1989 to 1994. He then served briefly as UNDP Regional Representative in Thailand, before taking up the post of Assistant Secretary-General for Human Resources Management of the United Nations, based in its New York Headquarters, serving from 1994 to 1997, when he was appointed United Nations Humanitarian Coordinator in Iraq.

After a 34-year career at the United Nations, where he had reached Assistant Secretary-General level, Halliday resigned in 1998, over the sanctions against Iraq, characterizing them as "genocide". He subsequently gave the following explanation of his decision to resign:

I often have to explain why I resigned from the United Nations after a 30-year career, why I took on the all-powerful states of the UN Security Council; and why after five years I continue to serve the well being of the people of Iraq. In reality, there was no choice, and there remains no choice. You all would have done the same had you been occupying my seat as head of the UN Humanitarian Program in Iraq.

I was driven to resignation because I refused to continue to take Security Council orders, the same Security Council that had imposed and sustained genocidal sanctions on the innocent of Iraq. I did not want to be complicit. I wanted to be free to speak out publicly about this crime.

Above all, my innate sense of justice was and still is outraged by the violence that UN sanctions have brought upon, and continue to bring upon, the lives of children, families – the extended families, and the loved ones of Iraq. There is no justification for killing the young people of Iraq, not the aged, not the sick, not the rich, not the poor.

Some will tell you that the leadership is punishing the Iraqi people. That is not my perception, or experience from living in Baghdad. And were that to be the case – how can that possibly justify further punishment, in fact collective punishment, by the United Nations? I don't think so. And international law has no provision for the disproportionate and murderous consequences of the ongoing UN embargo – for well over 12 long years.

In 2003 Halliday was presented with the Gandhi International Peace Award in recognition of his work drawing attention to the plight of Iraqis. In 2007, he presented the same award to the website Media Lens, whose co-founder David Edwards had interviewed Halliday in May 2000 about his work in Iraq. In 2009 Denis Halliday agreed to become a Patron of the Gandhi Foundation, and he presented the annual peace award to the Children's Legal Centre.

On 25 October 2007, when a statue of David Lloyd George was unveiled in Parliament Square, Halliday, Harold Pinter and John Pilger had a letter printed in The Daily Telegraph in which they condemned the "celebration of Lloyd George's legacy", as "disgraceful", likening his policies of aerial bombardment of Middle Eastern countries to the present day Iraq War.

Since leaving the UN, Halliday has been involved with a number of peace initiatives such as Perdana, founded by the Malaysian Prime Minister Mahathir Mohamad. He was one of the main witnesses for the defence in the trials of Mary Kelly and the Pitstop Ploughshares Five who in 2002 had separately damaged a US warplane, at Shannon Airport. The trials lasted over three years and all defendants were eventually acquitted. In 2014 he was again an expert witness at the trial of Margaretta D'Arcy who sat on a runway at Shannon airport to protest its use by the US military. In 2015 he was an expert witness for the defence at the trial of the TDs Clare Daly and Mick Wallace who went over the fence at the same airport to attempt to search a US plane for arms. D'Arcy served two terms in prison (three months and two weeks respectively) after she refused to sign a bond and on 22 April 2015 Deputies Wallace and Daly were convicted and fined €2000 each or 30 days imprisonment in default. Immediately afterwards both parliamentarians said on television that they would not pay.

Halliday was on board the humanitarian ship the MV Rachel Corrie en route to Gaza. In a statement released by the Ireland Palestine Solidarity Campaign, Halliday said, "We want to emphasise that our aim is not provocation but getting our aid cargo into Gaza. We are calling on the UN to inspect the cargo and escort us into Gaza, and to send a UN representative to sail on board before they enter the exclusion zone."

Halliday chaired three Permanent Peoples' Tribunal on Sri Lanka, drawing judgment on the Government of Sri Lanka as "guilty of the crime of genocide against the Eelam Tamil people."

== See also ==
- United Nations Security Council Resolution 986
- Campaign Against Sanctions and Military Intervention in Iran
- Sanctions against Iran
