= CRV =

CRV or CR-V may refer to:

== Transportation ==
- Carlinville station (Amtrak code: CRV), Carlinville, Illinois, US
- Craven Arms railway station (National Rail station code: CRV), Shropshire, England
- Crew Return Vehicle, an emergency return vehicle to be docked at a space station as a lifeboat
- Honda CR-V, an SUV manufactured by Honda

=== Aviation ===
- Acropolis Aviation (ICAO code: CRV), UK; See List of airline codes (A)
- Cargo Ivoire (ICAO code: CRV), Ivory Coast; See List of airline codes (C)
- Crotone Airport or Aeroporto di Crotone-Sant'Anna (IATA airport code: CRV)

== Science and technology ==
- Certificate revocation vector, an efficient format for revocation statuses
- Cheng rotation vane, a set of stationary vanes that eliminates flow turbulence in a piping system created by an elbow or tee
- Component Recordable Video, a type of Laserdisc
- Chromium-vanadium steel (Cr-V, CrV, or CrV), a group of steel alloys
- Corvus (constellation), in the Southern Celestial Hemisphere

== Other uses ==
- California Redemption Value, a fee paid on purchases of certain recyclable beverage containers in California
- Charles River Ventures, a venture capital firm
- Counter-Revolutionary Violence: Bloodbaths in Fact & Propaganda, a book by Noam Chomsky

== See also ==
- Central retinal vein occlusion (CRVO), in ophthalmology
- CR-V3 battery
- CRV7 (Canadian Rocket Vehicle 7), a ground attack rocket
- CRV, a member of a congregation of Augustinian religious
