= The Political Economy of Human Rights =

1979 book by Noam Chomsky and Edward S. Herman

The Political Economy of Human Rights, Volume 1 and Volume 2
- Authors: Noam Chomsky; Edward S. Herman
- Language: English
- Subject: Foreign policy of the United States
- Publisher: South End Press; Haymarket Books
- Publication date: 1979, 2014
- Publication place: United States
- Media type: Print
- Preceded by: Counter-Revolutionary Violence: Bloodbaths in Fact & Propaganda
- Followed by: Manufacturing Consent: The Political Economy of the Mass Media

The Political Economy of Human Rights is a 1979 two-volume work by Noam Chomsky and Edward S. Herman. The authors offer a critique of United States foreign policy, particularly in Indochina.

== Summary ==
Chomsky and Herman discuss United States foreign policy in Indochina, with significant focus on the Vietnam War. They include sections on the My Lai Massacre, Operation Speedy Express and the Phoenix Program.

The authors challenge received wisdom on foreign policy, presenting a stark critique of the international human rights record of the United States and an indictment of the American media and of academic scholarship, alleging their complicity in this record. The two volumes are:

- The Political Economy of Human Rights, Volume I: The Washington Connection and Third World Fascism (1979). ISBN 0-85124-248-0. ISBN 9781608464067.
- The Political Economy of Human Rights, Volume II: After the Cataclysm: Postwar Indochina and the Reconstruction of Imperial Ideology (1979). ISBN 0-85124-272-3. ISBN 9781608463978.

Both volumes were republished by Haymarket Books in 2014.

The first volume is a greatly expanded version of Chomsky and Herman's Counter-Revolutionary Violence: Bloodbaths in Fact & Propaganda. It repeats the themes of "bloodbath" and "terror" classification and the categories and examples discussed include:

- Benign – East Pakistan in 1971, Burundi in 1972; Indians of Latin America, particularly the genocide of the Aché of Paraguay, 1970s; East Timor, 1975–1979;
- Constructive – Indonesia in 1965–1966; French in Vietnam, 1950s; Diem regime in Vietnam, 1950s; the United States in Vietnam, 1960s; the United States in the Philippines, periodically from 1898 to 1979, when The Political Economy of Human Rights was published; Dominican Republic, 1965 to the 1970s, Latin America, from the American overthrow of the Guatemalan government in 1954 to the 1970s;
- Nefarious – Vietnamese revolutionary, 1950s and 1960s;
- Mythical – North Vietnamese land reform in the 1950s; North Vietnamese in Huế in 1968.

== Content ==
In the study's frontispiece, countries that practice torture on an administrative basis during the 1970s are listed. Most of these countries are defined by the authors as being in the US "sphere of influence". These include the right-wing dictatorships that at the time governed most of Latin America (see Operation Condor) as well as a handful of dictatorships in the Middle East (including the Shah's Iran which they quote the Secretary-General of Amnesty International as claiming to have the world's worst human rights record), Northern Africa, Southern Europe and Asia. The countries are said to be in the U.S. sphere of influence because they have been recipients of significant amounts of U.S. military aid and training.

The authors note that the study is not devoted to an analysis of the Soviet empire, although in summarizing their findings they do make some tangential remarks comparing the American and Soviet empires, the latter being defined by the authors as Eastern Europe. They quote Amnesty as finding that torture seems to have declined in Eastern Europe since the death of Stalin. From this they conclude that the growth of torture which has occurred since then, appears to be "largely a Free World phenomenon", i.e. occurring in the American sphere of influence.

In a critical review (see "Reception" below), Morris mentions Soviet backing for the Argentine dictatorship as an example of an alleged omission in the work he reviews. However, Chomsky and Herman do discuss that fact. They also feature references to Soviet (and American) support for human rights violations by Ethiopian governments. They present evidence of American support for the regime of Idi Amin.

In their chapter on Cambodia under Khmer Rouge rule, Chomsky and Herman firmly conclude that major atrocities have occurred. They review the available evidence, concluding that pieces of evidence that give the worst possible picture of the Khmer Rouge regime are given massive publicity in the U.S., while evidence giving a more positive picture—many of which they review, without endorsement—get systematically suppressed. One theme in the chapter is that, the very nature of the U.S. propaganda system is such that, analyses that present the Khmer Rouge in a favorable light, will be relegated to obscure sources.

The authors discuss, among many other documents, Murder in a Gentle Land by John Barron and Anthony Paul, a study extremely critical of the Khmer Rouge, which, they note was "widely and generally quite favorably reviewed" and "subject to extensive comment" served up to a "mass audience". They present a detailed review of the book, at the end of which they conclude that it "will not withstand scrutiny. The historical comments are worthless and their effort to document what might have been observed reduces to the testimony of refugees, that is, unverifiable testimony."

== Reception ==
Not being published by a major house, The Political Economy of Human Rights received hardly any reviews in mainstream American newspapers and popular journals.

One such review in the popular press came from Mac Margolis in The Boston Phoenix. Margolis first describes what he believes is "Chomsky's theme:" "In each of the essays (written between 1973 and 1981) Chomsky argues that it’s not just the rabid right but also the 'principled' left that has us in another Cold War frame of mind. It is the [Anthony] Lewises who, by calling the 'invasion of Vietnam' a 'tragic error' actually repair the imperial ego. And America repaired is America readied--for another adventure in another tropic, perhaps to protect some strategic corridor or some lucrative investment." Margolis' main concern was that "Chomsky does not answer the nagging question of why so many of us in a free press end up echoing so much of what we're told from the government we're supposed to be watching. He offers a paragraph or two proposing essentially that the media behave like other corporations or giant institutions, distributing favor and disfavor, reward and punishment, and that journalists practice a kind of 'voluntary censorship'."

A critical review was published in Harvard International Review, in 1981 by Stephen J Morris (of the Foreign Policy Institute, Johns Hopkins University), in which he accuses Chomsky and Herman of having an ingrained bias in the methodology they use to measure terror in the client states of the United States, and the client states of the Soviet Union.

He writes:

If Chomsky and Herman's comparison of Soviet and American spheres of influence were to be even remotely fair from an analytical standpoint, they would have to base it on (a) the United States and the other Western industrial democracies versus the Soviet Union and its Eastern European Communist allies, or (b) the United States, the other Western industrial democracies, and those third world nations armed and aided by the Western industrial democracies versus the Soviet Union, its Eastern European allies, and those third world nations armed and aided by the Soviet Union and its Warsaw Pact allies. This would inconveniently include not only Vietnam, Cuba, Ethiopia, etc., but also Idi Amin's Uganda, Masia's Equatorial Guinea and Qadaffi's Libya - all unfair competitors for the late Shah and the late President Park in the international human rights violation competition.

In regard to the Cambodia chapter, Morris writes that Chomsky and Herman "attempt to discredit their opponents [e.g. Barron and Paul, see above] by challenging their integrity, or by taking issue with some point of detail which they then blow out of all proportion, suggesting the rest of the study is questionable", while "abandon[ing] all critical scrutiny when it comes to the pro-Pol Pot reports".

As alleged examples of "pro-Pol Pot reports", Morris cites the direct participant in the Khmer Rouge's evacuation of Phnom Penh, Shane Tarr, and the academic specialists on Cambodia, Ben Kiernan and Michael Vickery. Morris accuses Chomsky and Herman of allegedly not subjecting these reports to critical scrutiny. Morris says that Kiernan's report in Australian Outlook "relied heavily on official regime publications, newspaper reports and mysterious second-hand accounts." Chomsky and Herman, in contrast, assert that the report's conclusions "are based in part on interviews with refugees".

== See also ==
- Counter-Revolutionary Violence: Bloodbaths in Fact & Propaganda
- Manufacturing Consent: The Political Economy of the Mass Media
