= David Cromwell =

British campaigner (born 1962)

David Cromwell (born 1962) is a British media campaigner and oceanographer. With David Edwards, he is a co-editor of the Media Lens website.

== Early life and education ==
Cromwell was born in Glasgow in 1962. His mother was a practicing Catholic. He spent his formative years in Barrhead and, mostly, Cumbernauld and graduated from the University of Glasgow with a degree in physics and astronomy. After completing a PhD in solar physics from the same university, which he was awarded in 1987, Cromwell moved to the United States in 1988 to pursue a year-long postdoctoral research at the National Center for Atmospheric Research in Boulder, Colorado.

== Career ==
Returning to Europe, Cromwell joined Shell International in 1989 as an exploration geophysicist. After five months of training in geology, geophysics, and management skills, Cromwell was posted to Shell's exploration and production company in Assen, Netherlands, while living in nearby Groningen. He left Shell in 1993. At that time, he was appointed to a research post at the National Oceanography Centre, Southampton, United Kingdom, but left academia in 2010 to work full-time on Media Lens. Founded in 2001 by Cromwell and David Edwards, Media Lens is a media analysis website which monitors the broadcast and the print media in the UK, attempting to show evidence of bias, distortions and omissions on such issues as climate change, Iraq, and the "war on terror". The founders of Media Lens draw on the 'Propaganda Model' of media control advanced by Edward S. Herman and Noam Chomsky.

Journalist Oliver Kamm, leader writer for The Times, criticised Media Lens for comments on the Srebrenica massacre and Rwandan genocide, describing the group as a "reliable conduit for denying genocide and whitewashing war crimes". In 2006, Kamm challenged Cromwell's dependence on American historian Howard Zinn, and both men's knowledge of source material relevant to America's atomic bombings of Hiroshima and Nagasaki, asserting that this was "a subject wholly outwith Cromwell's competence". David Cromwell wrote a rebuttal of Kamm's piece on the issue in January 2008. "Not unusually, one has to go to media such as" RT and Press TV "to find any coverage", Cromwell wrote in September 2016 (about the Yemeni civil war), which are "so often bitterly denigrated as 'propaganda' operations by corporate journalists".

Cromwell has written a number of books with Edwards. The earliest of these, titled Guardians of Power: The Myth of the Liberal Media, was published by Pluto Press in 2006. The authors argue, with reference to examples from the press and broadcasting, that the mass media in Britain enable 'state-corporate' power to pursue destructive aims at home and abroad. Their next book, Newspeak in the 21st Century, took a similar approach and appeared in 2009. Propaganda Blitz: How the Corporate Media Distort Reality was published by Pluto Press in 2018. In this book, the authors argue that "major news media are an intrinsic component of this system run for the benefit of elites. The media are, in effect, the public relations wing of a planetary-wide network of exploitation, abuse and destruction". Reviewing Propaganda Blitz in the International Journal of Communication, Alan MacLeod of Glasgow University described Cromwell and Edwards as "[t]wo of the most strident, long-standing and influential critics of the media".

As a solo author, Cromwell has written Private Planet (Charlbury: Jon Carpenter Publishing, 2001) and Why Are We the Good Guys?: Reclaiming Your Mind from the Delusions of Propaganda. In a review of the book, Ian Sinclair, writing for the Morning Star, described Cromwell as "one of the most incisive and humane radical writers working today". Together with historian Mark Levene, Cromwell founded the Crisis Forum, in 2002. According to Paul Robert Bartrop, Steven Leonard Jacobs, it is a "consciousness-raising body that believes humankind is in serious trouble due to an economic and political system that is destroying its ability to sustain its existence." Cromwell and Levene edited a collection of essays, Surviving Climate Change: The Struggle to Avert Global Catastrophe, which was published by Pluto Press in, 2007.
