= Guardians of Power =

Book by David Edwards

Guardians of Power: The Myth of the Liberal Media
- Author: David Edwards, David Cromwell
- Language: English
- Genre: Non-fiction
- Publisher: Pluto Press
- Publication date: 2006
- Publication place: United Kingdom
- ISBN: 9780745324838

Guardians of Power: The Myth of the Liberal Media (ISBN 9780745324838) is a book by David Edwards and David Cromwell, editors of the British media analysis Media Lens website, published in 2006 by Pluto Press of London.

== Outline ==
Basing their analysis on the propaganda model of Edward S. Herman and Noam Chomsky, the authors argue that a corporate, for-profit media sector cannot be trusted to report fairly on other corporations, such as companies which advertise in that same media, as any such criticism is filtered out. Reprinted within it are email exchanges with editors and journalists from the main terrestrial British broadcasters, plus The Guardian and The Independent newspapers. "This book provides a snapshot of the two Davids' guerrilla campaigning over the past five years," wrote Brendan O'Neill in The Spectator.

== Responses ==
Peter Wilby concluded his New Statesman review in January 2006 with the comment that "All journalists should read [this book], because the Davids make a case that demands to be answered". He felt the book had some flaws, in particular he objected to their suggestion "that properly radical papers should refuse, say, airline ads. The effect would merely be to bankrupt any paper to the left of the Mail". Reviewing the book for The Irish Times, Eddie Halt praised "their excellently researched accounts of undeniable media bias", which he says "asks serious questions about the elite media". O'Neill thought that "there is some good material here, especially on the liberal media’s servility during times of war".

According to Jeff Sparrow, writing for The Age in 2006, despite possessing "something of the child's naive obstinacy in the authors' refusal to accept the journalistic practices at which most people cynically shrug", within Guardians of Power, Edwards and Cromwell "expose the fundamental contradiction between, on the one hand, our need for information about the world and, on the other, the need of media conglomerates to deliver returns to their shareholders".

Exempting the Statesman from his point, the journalist and documentary film maker John Pilger, in a column published nearly two years later, said of the book, "Not a single national newspaper [in the UK] reviewed the most important book about journalism I can remember."
