= Helen Steven =

Scottish Quaker peace activist

- Born: 19 October 1942
- Died: 12 April 2016 (aged 73)
- Known for: Peace activism, nonviolent protest, and opposition to nuclear weapons
- Awards: Gandhi International Peace Award

Helen Steven (19 October 1942 – 12 April 2016) was a Scottish Quaker peace activist and one of the founders of the Scottish Centre for Nonviolence. Her opposition to the nuclear submarine base in Scotland was recognised with the Gandhi International Peace Award in 2004.

== Life ==
Steven was educated at Laurel Bank School and at the University of Glasgow, and worked for several years as a history teacher. She volunteered with the Peace Corps in Vietnam in the early 1970s, and traced her commitment to pacifism to her experiences in Vietnam.

During the early 1970s she became Ellen Moxley's life partner.

From 1979 to 1985, she was justice and peace worker for the Iona Community.

With her partner Ellen Moxley, she founded Peace House in Braco, Perthshire in 1985, providing training in peace, justice and nonviolent direct action. More than ten thousand people attended the course over a twelve-year period. During that time, Steven and Moxley chose to live below the tax threshold, so they would not have to contribute to funding the British nuclear arsenal. Steven later helped to establish the Scottish Centre for Nonviolence in 1999 in Dunblane. The Centre closed in 2007, but during that time Steven was able to develop a non-violence module for a masters degree that was accredited by the Open University.

In 1984, after being arrested for taking part in a nonviolent demonstration at the Faslane nuclear base, Steven said in her defence statement: "If I see that base at Faslane as morally wrong and against my deepest convictions – as wrong as the gas chambers of Auschwitz, as wrong as the deliberate starvation of children – then by keeping silent, I condone what goes on there". She refused to pay the fine and was imprisoned.

In the 2000 book, No Alternative? Nonviolent Responses to Repressive Regimes, edited by John Lampen, Steven argued that there was meaning in each and every act of resistance, no matter how small. One of the examples she highlighted was opposition to the Augusto Pinochet regime in Chile, which finally fell after 20 years of solidarity concerts, Amnesty International letters, speaking tours by Chilean refugees, and countless symbolic acts of protest.

In 2002 she and Moxley retired to Raffin in Assynt in northern Scotland. They received the Gandhi International Peace Award in 2004 for their nonviolent campaigning against weapons of mass destruction.

Steven delivered the annual Swarthmore Lecture to British Quakers in 2005, on the topic No Extraordinary Power: Prayer, Stillness and Activism.

Steven died in 2016.

== See also ==
- List of peace activists
