= Al-Am'ari =

al-Am'ari Refugee Camp
- Refugee camp

Arabic transcription(s)
  - Arabic: مخيّم الأمعري
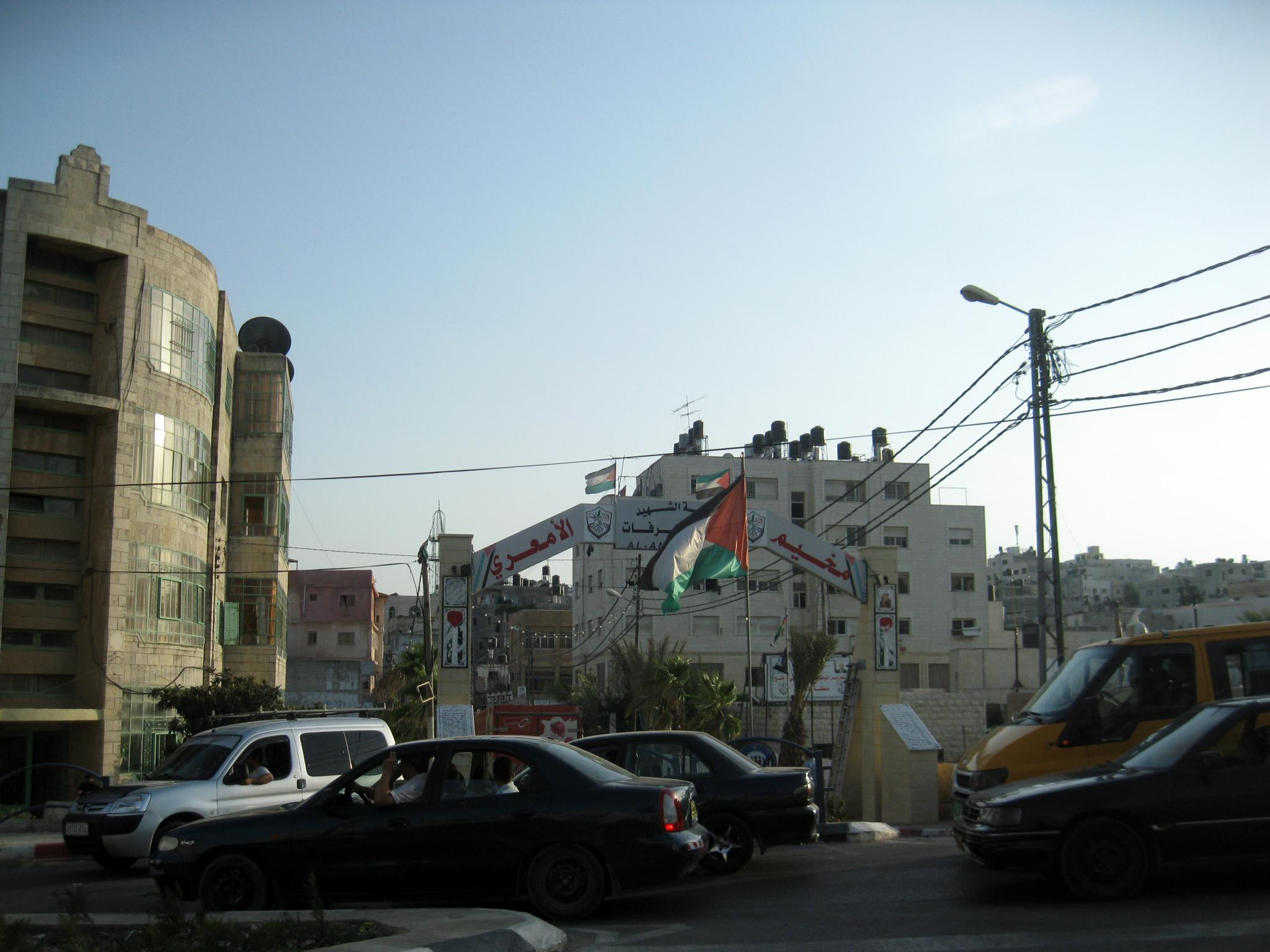
- al-Am'ari Refugee Camp

- Location of al-Am'ari Refugee Camp within Palestine
- Coordinates: 31°53′38.60″N 35°12′41.52″E
- State: State of Palestine
- Governorate: Ramallah and al-Bireh

Government
  - Type: Refugee camp

Area
  - Total: 0.096 km^{2} (0.037 sq mi)

Population (2017)
  - Total: 4,725
  - Density: 49,000/km^{2} (130,000/sq mi)

al-Am'ari Refugee Camp (Arabic: مخيّم الأمعري) is a Palestinian refugee camp in the Ramallah and al-Bireh Governorate, located 2 kilometers south of Al Bireh in the central West Bank. According to the Palestinian Central Bureau of Statistics (PCBS), the camp had a population of 4,725 inhabitants in 2017. The al-Am'ari camp has 10,377 registered refugees.

== History ==
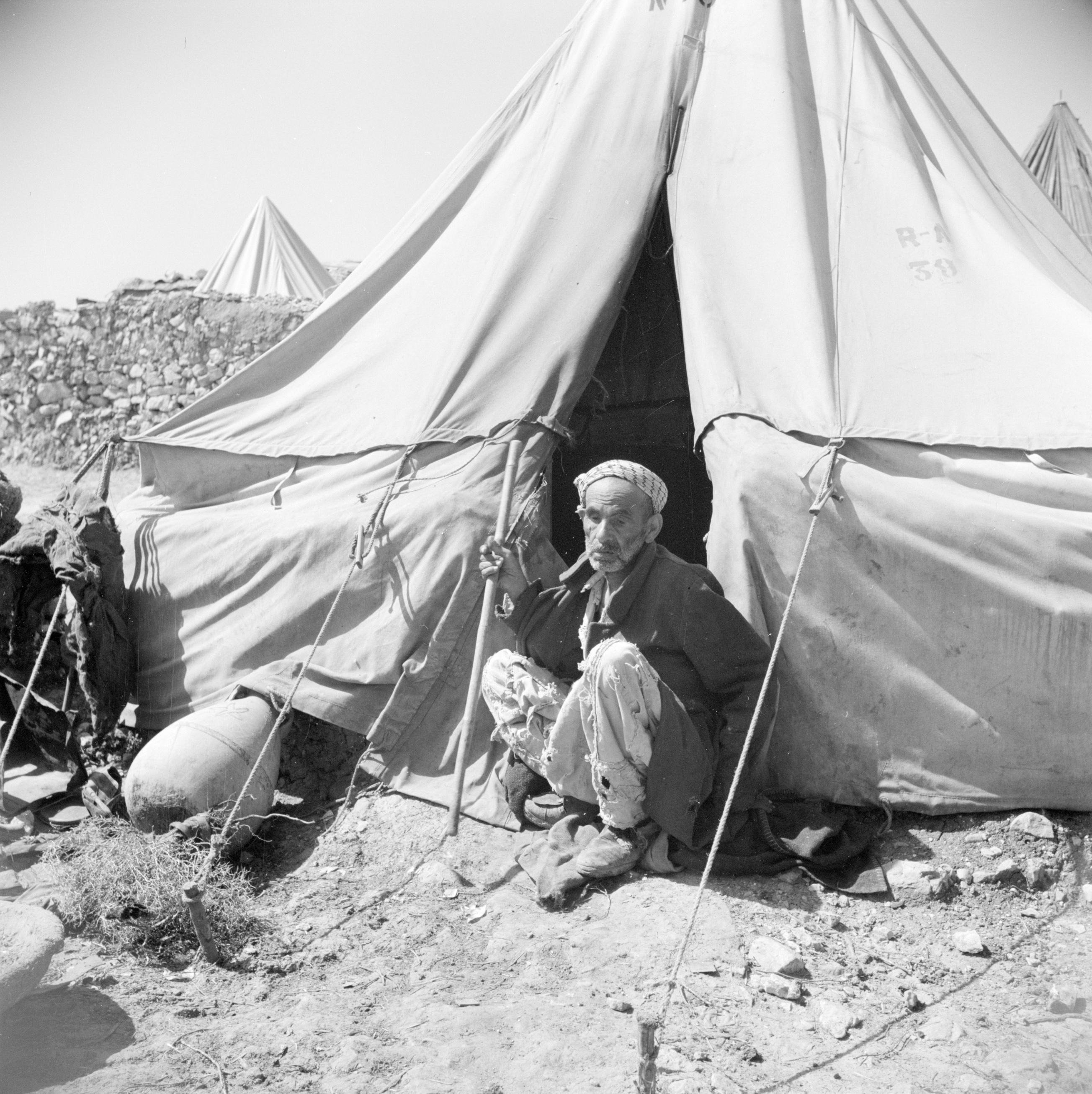
Refugee in front of his tent in the camp in 1950

The al-Am'ari camp was established in 1949 on 90 dunums within the municipal boundaries of al-Bireh. By 1957, all tents in the camp were replaced with cement block shelters. Like most of the West Bank camps, Amari suffers from overcrowding, poor sewerage and water networks. The camp falls in under Palestinian Authority control. The refugee camp has two schools; the boys' school has 1250 pupils and the girls' school has 970 pupils.

During the First Intifada on 3 April 1989, Muhammad Ismail, aged 20, was shot dead by Israeli soldiers. Eleven months later the Central Command military advocate concluded that soldiers did not deviate from orders, and the file was closed.

The al-Am'ari camp's football team has won the Palestine football championship several times and has been designated to represent Palestine in regional and international competitions.

Ramzi Aburedwan was raised in Am'ari.

In 2016, the German rapper Kollegah founded the Kollegah educational school, which provides education for the children living in the camp.
