= Manufacturing Consent =

1988 book by Edward S. Herman and Noam Chomsky

Manufacturing Consent: The Political Economy of the Mass Media
- Cover of the first edition
- Authors: Edward S. Herman; Noam Chomsky
- Language: English
- Subject: Media of the United States
- Publisher: Pantheon Books
- Publication date: 1988
- Publication place: United States
- Media type: Print (Hardcover, Paperback)
- ISBN: 0-375-71449-9
- OCLC: 47971712
- Dewey Decimal: 381/.4530223 21
- LC Class: P96.E25 H47 2002
- Preceded by: The Fateful Triangle: The United States, Israel, and the Palestinians
- Followed by: Necessary Illusions

Manufacturing Consent: The Political Economy of the Mass Media is a 1988 book by Edward S. Herman and Noam Chomsky. It argues that the mass communication media of the U.S. "are effective and powerful ideological institutions that carry out a system-supportive propaganda function, by reliance on market forces, internalized assumptions, and self-censorship, and without overt coercion", by means of the propaganda model of communication. The title refers to consent of the governed, and derives from the phrase "the manufacture of consent" used by Walter Lippmann in Public Opinion (1922). Manufacturing Consent was honored with the Orwell Award for "outstanding contributions to the critical analysis of public discourse" in 1989.

A 2002 revision takes account of developments such as the fall of the Soviet Union. A 2009 interview with the authors notes the effects of the internet on the propaganda model.

== Background ==
=== Origins ===
Chomsky credits the impetus of Manufacturing Consent to Alex Carey, the Australian social psychologist, to whom the book is dedicated. The book was greatly inspired by Herman's earlier financial research.

=== Authorship ===
Herman was a professor of finance at Wharton School at the University of Pennsylvania, and Chomsky is a linguist and activist scholar, who has written many other books, such as Towards a New Cold War. Before Manufacturing Consent was published in 1988, the two authors had previously collaborated on the same subject. Their book Counter-Revolutionary Violence: Bloodbaths in Fact & Propaganda, a book about American foreign policy and the media, was published in 1973. The publisher for the book, a subsidiary of Warner Communications Incorporated, was deliberately put out of print after publishing 20,000 copies of the book, most of which were destroyed, so the book was not widely known.

According to Chomsky, "most of the book [Manufacturing Consent]" was the work of Edward S. Herman. Herman describes a rough division of labor in preparing the book whereby he was responsible for the preface and chapters 1–4 while Chomsky was responsible for chapters 5–7. According to Herman, the propaganda model described in the book was originally his idea, tracing it back to his 1981 book Corporate Control, Corporate Power. The main elements of the propaganda model (though not so-called at the time) were discussed briefly in volume 1 chapter 2 of Herman and Chomsky's 1979 book The Political Economy of Human Rights, where they argued, "Especially where the issues involve substantial U.S. economic and political interests and relationships with friendly or hostile states, the mass media usually function much in the manner of state propaganda agencies."

== Propaganda model of communication ==
The book introduced the propaganda model of communication, which is still developing today.

The propaganda model for the manufacture of public consent describes five editorially distorting filters, which are said to affect reporting of news in mass communications media. These five filters of editorial bias are:

1. Size, ownership, and profit orientation: The dominant mass-media are large profit-based operations, and therefore they must cater to the financial interests of the owners such as corporations and controlling investors. The size of a media company is a consequence of the investment capital required for the mass-communications technology required to reach a mass audience of viewers, listeners, and readers.
2. The advertising license to do business: Since the majority of the revenue of major media outlets derives from advertising (not from sales or subscriptions), advertisers have acquired a "de facto licensing authority". Media outlets are not commercially viable without the support of advertisers. News media must therefore cater to the political prejudices and economic desires of their advertisers. This has weakened the working class press, for example, and also helps explain the attrition in the number of newspapers.
3. Sourcing mass media news: Herman and Chomsky argue that "the large bureaucracies of the powerful subsidize the mass media, and gain special access [to the news], by their contribution to reducing the media's costs of acquiring [...] and producing, news. The large entities that provide this subsidy become 'routine' news sources and have privileged access to the gates. Non-routine sources must struggle for access, and may be ignored by the arbitrary decision of the gatekeepers." Editorial distortion is aggravated by the news media's dependence upon private and governmental news sources. If a given newspaper, television station, magazine, etc., incurs disfavor from the sources, it is subtly excluded from access to information. A news organisation loses readers or viewers, and ultimately, advertisers. To minimize such financial danger, news media businesses editorially distort their reporting to favor government and corporate policies to stay in business.
4. Flak and the enforcers: "Flak" refers to negative responses to a media statement or program (e.g. letters, complaints, lawsuits, or legislative actions). Flak can be expensive to the media, either due to loss of advertising revenue, or due to the costs of legal defense or defense of the media outlet's public image. Flak can be organized by powerful, private influence groups (e.g. think tanks). The prospect of eliciting flak can be a deterrent to the reporting of certain kinds of facts or opinions.
5. Anti-communism: This filter concerns the spectre of a common enemy which can be used to marginalise dissent: "This ideology helps mobilize the populace against an enemy, and because the concept is fuzzy it can be used against anybody advocating policies that threaten [dominant] interests". Anti-communism was included as a filter in the original 1988 edition of the book, but Chomsky argues that since the end of the Cold War (1945–91) anticommunism was replaced by the "war on terror" as the major social control mechanism.

=== The propaganda model of communication and its influence over major media organizations ===
The propaganda model describes the pillars of society (the public domain, business firms, media organizations, governments etc.) as first and foremost, profit-seekers. To fully consider the effects of the propaganda model, a tiered diagram can be drawn. Due to the impressionable and exploitative nature of major media organizations including broadcast media, print media, and 21st century social media, media organizations are placed at the bottom. Higher up the model, it pans to the larger organizations that are financially capable of controlling advertising licenses, lawsuits, or selling environments. The first level displays the public domain in which prominent ideologies within the masses can influence the intentions of mass media. The second level pertaining to the business firms accounts for the media’s source of information as business firms are wealthy enough to supply information to media organizations while maintaining control over where advertisers can sell their advertisements and stories. The final layer, the governments of the major global powers, are the wealthiest subgroup of the pillars of society. Having the most financial wealth and organizational power, media organizations are most dependent on government structures for financial stability and political direction.

== Influence and impact ==
- In 2006, Fatih Tas, owner of the Aram editorial house, along with two editors and the translator of the revised, 2001 edition of Manufacturing Consent were prosecuted by the Turkish government for "stirring hatred among the public" (per Article 216 of the Turkish Penal Code) and for "denigrating the national identity" of Turkey (per Article 301). The reason cited was that the introduction to this edition addresses the 1990s' Turkish news media reportage of governmental suppression of the Kurdish populace. The defendants were ultimately acquitted.
- In 2007, from May 15 to 17 at the 20 Years of Propaganda?: Critical Discussions & Evidence on the Ongoing Relevance of the Herman & Chomsky Propaganda Model conference held at the University of Windsor, Herman and Chomsky summarized developments to the propaganda model on the occasion of the vicennial anniversary of first publication of Manufacturing Consent.
- A 2011 Chinese translation was published by Peking University.

== Documentary adaptation ==
The 1992 documentary film Manufacturing Consent: Noam Chomsky and the Media directed by Mark Achbar and Peter Wintonick first opened at the Film Forum. This three-hour adaptation considers the propaganda model of communication and the politics of the mass-communications business, with emphasis on Chomsky's ideas and career.

== See also ==
- Cultural hegemony
- Filter bubble
- Inverted totalitarianism
- Manufacturing Consent, 1979 book by Michael Burawoy
- Media bias
- Media imperialism
- Michael Parenti, Marxist author of the similar book Inventing Reality: The Politics of the Mass Media (1986)
- Nicaraguan general election, 1984 (US media coverage is the focus of Chapter 3)
- Politico-media complex
- Preference falsification

Other works

- The Engineering of Consent
- Merchants of Doubt
- Spin (1995 film)
- The Panama Deception
