= William Peters (diplomat) =

British diplomat (1923–2014)

William Peters CMG LVO MBE (28 September 1923 – 23 March 2014), also known as Bill Peters, was a British diplomat who co-founded the Jubilee 2000 Drop the Debt campaign.

Peters was born at Morpeth, Northumberland. The highlight of his career after retirement was his co-founding, with Martin Dent of Keele University, of the Jubilee 2000 Drop the Debt campaign, which went on to become the Make Poverty History movement.

He studied Greats at Balliol College, Oxford, but his studies were interrupted by World War II when he saw active service with the 9th Ghurkha rifles. After the war he completed his undergraduate studies in 1948 and went on to further study at the LSE and SOAS. Peters then joined the Colonial Service with a posting to the Gold Coast in 1950 where he worked to prepare for the transition to independence. In 1977, he became British Ambassador to Uruguay. He went on to work as High Commissioner in Malawi before retiring from the Foreign Office in 1983.

A few years after retirement Peters met Martin Dent of Keele University and realised that Martin shared his concern at what they considered to be unsustainable levels of third world debt. They co-founded a campaign to write off third-world debt in time for the Millennium. They called this Jubilee 2000 in reference to the Old Testament Jubilee requirement to cancel debts every seven years. It was supported by the Anglican Church, with the Archbishop of Canterbury, George Carey, addressing a rally in Trafalgar Square with Bill and Martin and making Jubilee 2000 the subject of his New Year's Day Millennium address on BBC 1.

UK Chancellor of the Exchequer, Gordon Brown also spoke at a rally in St Paul's Cathedral, strongly supporting the campaign and confirming the cancellation of all debts to the UK. Peters continued to play an active role in the Drop the Debt campaign in the lead up to the Millennium, seeing it grow into a series of large- scale demonstrations and twice enter The Guinness Book Of Records, once for the largest petition and once for the most international petition. The campaign launched major demonstrations at every G8 summit from 1998 in Birmingham to Cologne and Genoa with a few people even travelling to Okinawa in Japan.

Peters received the Gandhi International Peace Award from the Gandhi Foundation in recognition of his efforts and of the success of the Jubilee 2000 campaign, which 'made possible the provision of basic education and health-care to thousands of people.'

He died on 23 March 2014.
