= Martin Dent (academic) =

English academic

Martin Dent, OBE (11 July 1925 – 2 May 2014) was an English academic who was the co-founder with retired diplomat William Peters of Jubilee 2000; an international coalition movement in over 40 countries that called for cancellation of third world debt by the year 2000.

The son of Geoffrey and Marian Dent, he was born in Harlow, Essex and was educated at Eton College, Trinity College, Cambridge, where he gained a degree in history and economics and Worcester College, Oxford. After national service in the Garhwal Rifles regiment of the Indian Army he was a colonial civil servant in Nigeria where he helped to quell unrest and became a hero to the Tiv people. He then spent the rest of his career from 1963 to 1990 as a lecturer in the Department of Politics at Keele University. He received the Gandhi International Peace Award from the Gandhi Foundation in recognition of his efforts and of the success of the Jubilee 2000 campaign. In 1992 he was the Liberal Democrat General Election candidate for Stoke-on-Trent Central constituency and served as councillor for East Valley ward of Stoke-on-Trent City Council between 2002 and 2004.
