= Permanent Peoples' Tribunal on Sri Lanka =

The Permanent Peoples' Tribunal on Sri Lanka refers to three tribunals conducted by the Permanent Peoples' Tribunal on the events that took place during the Sri Lankan Civil War.

== Dublin, 2010 ==
The first Permanent People's Tribunal on Sri Lanka was held between 14 and 16 January 2010 at The Irish School of Ecumenics, Trinity College Dublin organized by the Irish Forum for Peace in Sri Lanka.

The tribunal consisted of

- François Houtart (chairperson) - Professor Emeritus of Catholic University of Louvain
- Daniel Feierstein - Director of the Centre for Genocide Studies at the Universidad Nacional de Tres de Febrero and Professor in the Faculty of Genocide at the University of Buenos Aires
- Denis Halliday - former Assistant Secretary-General of the United Nations
- Mary Lawlor - Director, Front Line, The International Foundation for the Protection of Human Rights Defenders, Dublin
- Francesco Martone - former Italian Senator in Italy
- Nawal al Saadawi - Egyptian writer, former United Nations' Advisor for the Women's Programme in Africa
- Rajindar Sachar - former Chief Justice, High Court of Delhi and the Chairperson of the Indian Prime Minister's High Committee on the social, economic and educational status of the Muslim community in India.
- Sulak Sivaraksa - Thai Buddhist peace campaigner and writer
- Gianni Tognoni - Secretary General, Permanent People's Tribunal, Rome.
- Øystein Tveter - Norwegian scholar and member of the People's Tribunal on extrajudicial killings and violations of human rights in the Philippines

== Bremen, 2013 ==
The second Permanent People's Tribunal on Sri Lanka was held between 7 and 10 December 2013 at Bremen, Germany organized by the International Human Rights Association, Bremen and the Irish Forum for Peace in Sri Lanka, Dublin.

The tribunal consisted of

- Daniel Feierstein (Co‐Chair) - Director of the Centre for Genocide Studies at the Universidad Nacional de Tres de Febrero and Professor in the Faculty of Genocide at the University of Buenos Aires
- Denis Halliday (Co‐Chair) - former Assistant Secretary-General of the United Nations
- Gabriele Della Morte - Professor of International Law at the Università Cattolica di Milano, counsel for the International Criminal Tribunal for Rwanda (ICTR) (2003‐2004), Law Clerk for the Prosecutor Office of the International Criminal Tribunal for the former Yugoslavia (2000)
- José Elías Esteve Molto - Professor in International Law at the University of Valencia
- Sévane Garibian - Assistant Professor at the University of Geneva
- Haluk Gerger - academic
- Javier Giraldo Moreno - Colombian Theologian and human rights activist, Vice‐President of the Permanent Peoples' Tribunal
- Manfred O. Hinz - Professor for Public Law, Political Sociology and Sociology of Law at the University of Bremen
- Helen Jarvis - Chief of the Victims' Support Section, Extraordinary Chambers in the Courts of Cambodia
- Øystein Tveter - Norwegian scholar and member of the People's Tribunal on extrajudicial killings and violations of human rights in the Philippines
- Maung Zarni - Burmese democracy activist

== Berlin, 2023 ==
The third Permanent People's Tribunal on Sri Lanka was held between 20 and 22 May 2022 at Berlin, Germany organized by the International Human Rights Association, Bremen and the Irish Forum for Peace in Sri Lanka, Dublin.

The tribunal consisted of

- Denis Halliday - former Assistant Secretary-General of the United Nations
- Javier Giraldo Moreno - Colombian Theologian and human rights activist, Vice‐President of the Permanent Peoples' Tribunal
- Ana Esther Cecena - Director of Latin American Geopolitical Observatory and professor at the National Autonomous University of Mexico
- Flavia Carvalho - Brazilian supreme court assistant judge and an Afro-Brazilian feminist
- Lourdes Esther Huanca Atencio - President of the National Federation of Female Peasants, Artisans, Indigenous, Native and Salaried Workers of Peru
- Feliciano Valencia - former Colombian senator, a Nasa Indigenous leader of the Cauca region
- Na'eem Jeenah - Executive director of the Afro-Middle East Centre in South Africa and former president of Muslim Youth Movement of South Africa
- Liza Maza - General secretary of International League of People's Struggle (ILPS) and a former member of Philippine's House of Representatives
- Lonko Juana Culfunao Paillal - A leader of the Mapuche indigenous community of south-western Chile and the founder of Ethical Commission Against Torture
- Junaid S. Ahmad - Director of the Centre for the Study of Islam and Decoloniality, Islamabad and Founder and Chair of the Palestine Solidarity Committee, Pakistan
- Gianni Tognoni - General secretary of the Permanent Peoples' Tribunal, Rome
