= David Edwards (journalist) =

British media campaigner (born 1962)

David Edwards (born 1962) is a British media campaigner who is co-editor of the Media Lens website with David Cromwell. Edwards specialises in the analysis of mainstream (or corporate) mass media, which are normally considered impartial or liberal, an interpretation both men believe is disputable.

== Early life and education ==
Born in Maidstone, Kent, in 1962, Edwards was raised in the village of Bearsted, and spent summers in Sweden, his mother's country of origin. He sees this as influencing his attitudes to modern living. After graduating from Leicester University with a Politics degree he worked in sales and marketing management for several large corporations, but became dissatisfied with the corporate working environment. According to Edwards, while working at British Telecom in the late 1980s, his employment there became untenable after he attempted to set up a "green initiatives" project.

== Career ==
In 1991, feeling he was "not fully alive", he left the business world completely to begin his writing career, taking the advice of Joseph Campbell, the American mythologist, to "follow your bliss", Edwards earned most of his income at this time by teaching English as a foreign language. After his early articles were published on human rights and environmental issues by independent magazines and journals (such as Z Magazine), Edwards wrote his first book, Free to be Human, (Green Books, 1995), which later appeared in the United States as Burning All Illusions: a Guide to Personal and Political Freedom (South End Press, 1996). It relies on Edward S. Herman and Noam Chomsky's propaganda model, as well as on the writings of Erich Fromm. Edwards advanced the thesis that corporate structural factors conspire to make the mass media give a picture of the world that goes beyond the political indoctrination postulated by Herman and Chomsky, to encompass almost all aspects of personal life, by constantly promoting the values of blind consumerism.

Edwards has drawn on his practice of Buddhism in his writings. Edwards was remote working in Bournemouth for the International Society for Ecology and Culture at the time he first met David Cromwell. Together with Cromwell, Edwards co-founded in 2001 (and remains a co-editor of) Media Lens, a website correcting what they perceive as bias in the British "corporate media". The Media Lens' editors have collaborated on two books, Guardians of Power: The Myth of the Liberal Media (2006) and Newspeak in the 21st Century (2009).

== Bibliography ==
- Edwards, David (1998) The Compassionate Revolution: Radical Politics and Buddhism, Dartington: Green Books
- Edwards, David (2000) Free to Be Human: Intellectual Self-defence in an Age of Illusions, Dartington: Green Books (published in America as Burning all Illusions)
- Edwards, David (2005) Guardians of Power: The Myth of the Liberal Media, London: Pluto Press
- Edwards, David (2009) Newspeak in the 21st Century, London: Pluto Press
- Edwards, David (2010) "Normalising the unthinkable: The media's role in mass killing", in Peace Journalism, War and Conflict Resolution, ed. Richard Lance Keeble, John Tulloch, Florian Zollman, New York: Peter Lang
