= Elliot Murphy =

English neuroscientist and author

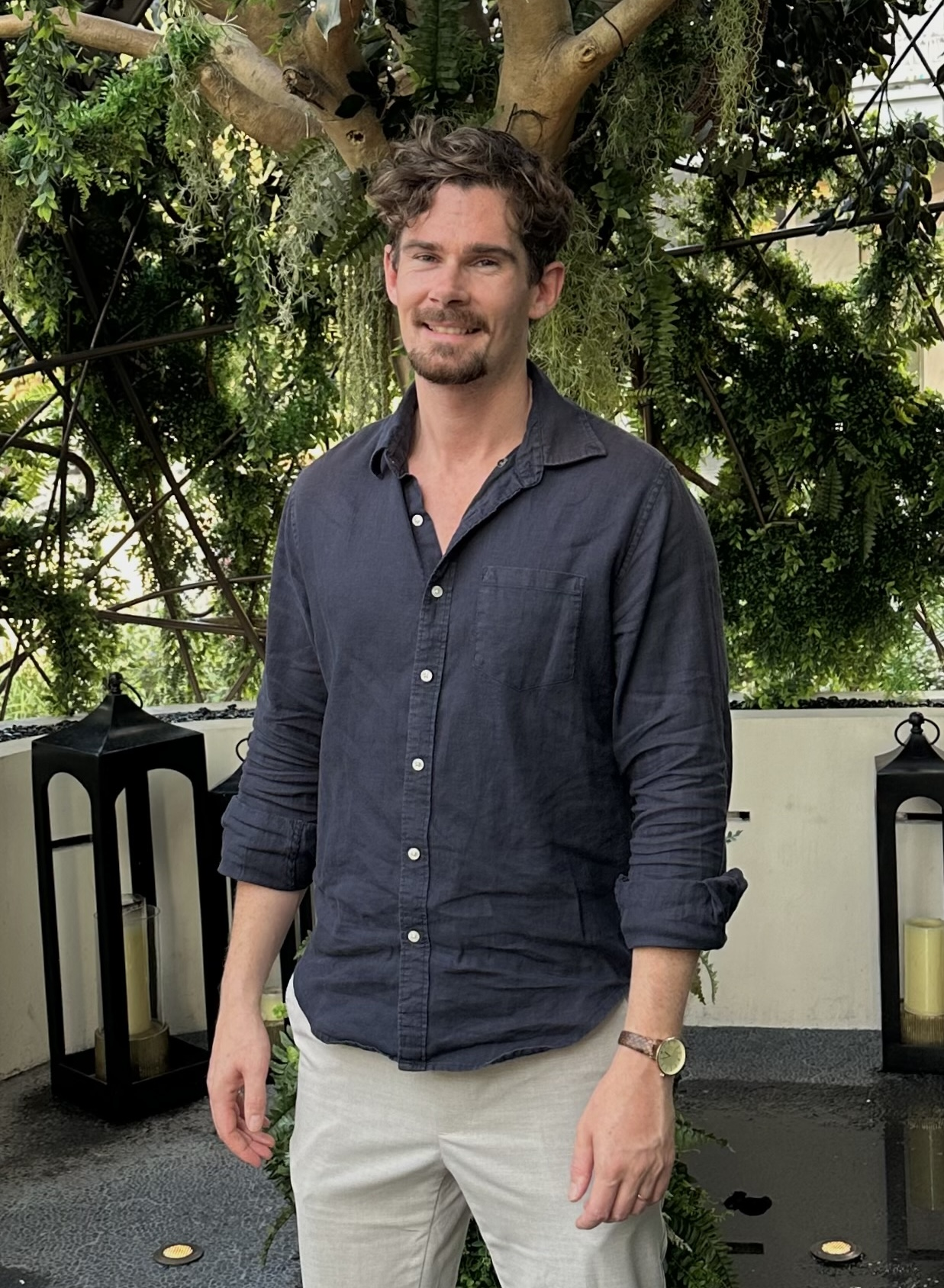
- Murphy in Texas in 2024
- Born: Liverpool, U.K.

Education
- Education: University College London (MA, MSc, PhD), University of Nottingham (BA)

Philosophical work
- Notable ideas: Influenced by Noam Chomsky, Karl J. Friston, David Poeppel, John Cowper Powys, John Horton Conway
- Website: elliot-murphy.com

Elliot Murphy (born 1991 in Liverpool) is an English author, neuroscientist, linguist, philosopher, literary critic, and political economist. He is a researcher at the Vivian L. Smith Department of Neurosurgery, McGovern Medical School, University of Texas Health Science Center. His research focuses on the neurobiology of language using intracranial recordings, and compositionality in formal systems, neural systems, and artificial systems. He is the author of Unmaking Merlin: Anarchist Tendencies in English Literature (2014), Arms in Academia: The Political Economy of the Modern UK Defence Industry (2020), and The Oscillatory Nature of Language (2020).

== Research ==
Murphy completed his PhD in Linguistics at University College London in 2021, writing a thesis on polysemy and copredication. This concerned the acceptability and processing properties of 'impossible' semantic objects, and implications for philosophy of language and theories of parsing.

In 2015, he proposed that oscillatory phase synchronization subserves hierarchical, compositional syntactic inferences. Since then, he has developed a neurocomputational model of language termed ROSE (Representation, Operation, Structure, Encoding). ROSE is a multi-scale neural architecture grounded in a neurobiologically feasible causal topology, mechanistic basis, and a set of oscillatory motifs that Murphy argues comply with known algebraic properties of language. ROSE focuses on the development of a hybrid model for compositionality in minds and neural systems, leveraging the strengths of both symbolic and connectionist approaches, with an emphasis on oscillatory mechanisms like phase-amplitude coupling and spike-phase coupling. Murphy has argued that ROSE provides a scaffold for a 'Universal Neural Grammar', "a species-specific format for neurally organizing the construction of compositional syntactic structures, which matures in accordance with a genetically determined biological matrix".

ROSE ensures that the neurocomputational architecture for language complies with the non-associativity of constituent structure generation whilst neurally enforcing order-insensitive commutativity. It has been recognized as a psycholinguistically and neurobiologically plausible foundation for recursive natural language syntax. It has been used to anchor neurolinguistic experimental results. ROSE has also been critically appraised and assessed positively for moving beyond traditional localizationism and its ability to relate to other domain of cognitive science, such as memory research. Others have noted that it should be integrated further and more explicitly with cross-modal data, such as sign language, at the risk of prioritizing spoken language. Some have argued that ROSE does not exhaust the means through which the brain might compose complex linguistic meanings, and that other architectures might be relevant for issues relating to sentence parsing.

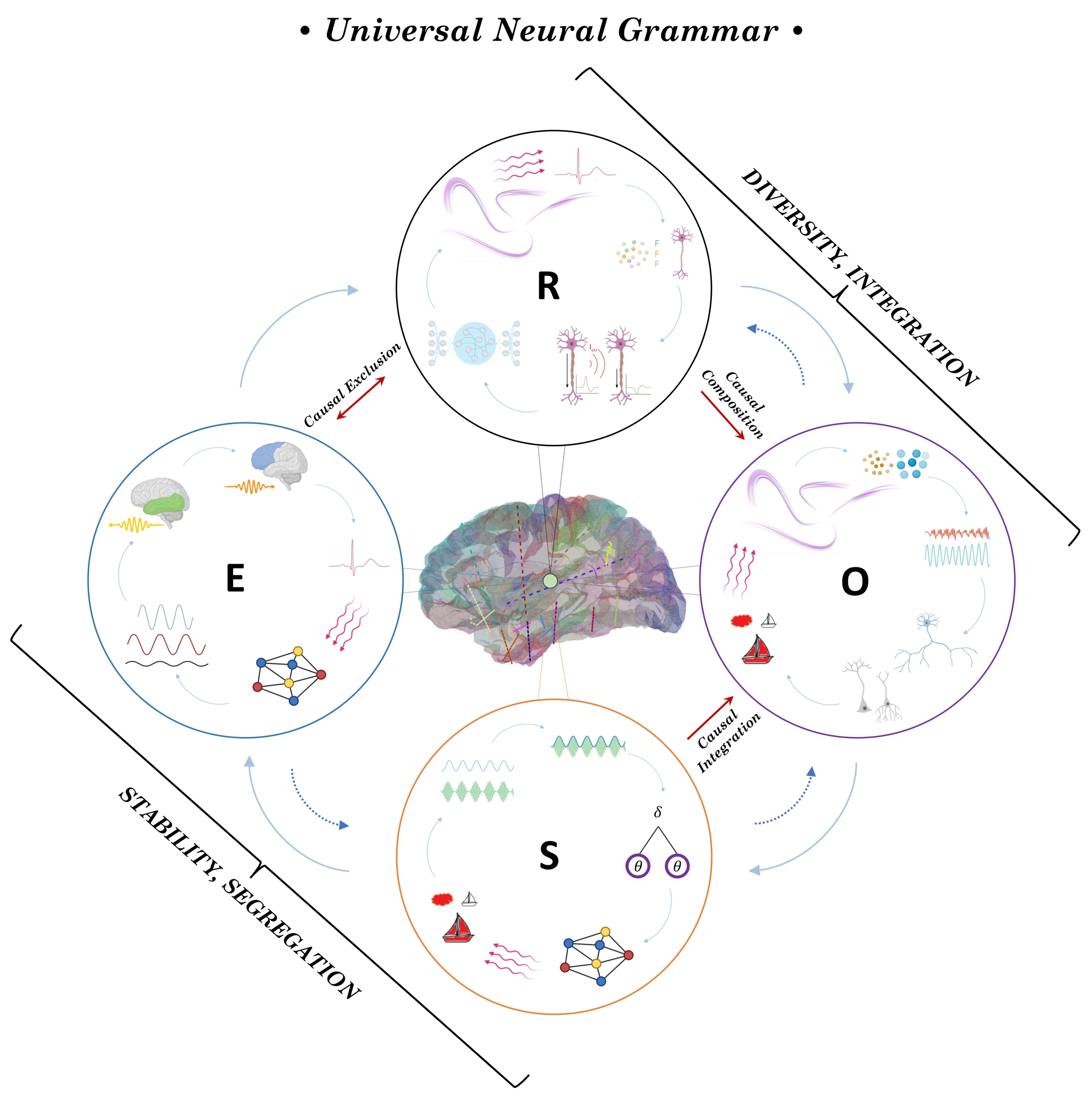
Schema of Universal Neural Grammar from Murphy's ROSE model.

With neuroscientists Karl Friston and Emma Holmes, his work has explored connections between the free-energy principle and human language, arguing that certain formal design features of natural language syntax can be seen as complying with the demands of active inference. He has written critiques of modern deep learning approaches to artificial intelligence with cognitive scientist Gary Marcus. In a discussion with Michael Levin and in a debate with Steven Piantadosi, he has defended generative grammar approaches to human language and advocates for neurosymbolic solutions in AI research.

Using intracranial recordings, Murphy has uncovered a cortical mosaic for hierarchical linguistic structure in posterior temporal cortex, whereby specific portions of the posterior superior temporal sulcus exhibit sensitivity to phrase structure and lexicality. Murphy and colleagues have extended this cortical mosaic framework to a whole-brain analysis of semantic processing.

Murphy has also published research and commentary articles on security, defense and humanitarian issues, political philosophy, and literary criticism.
