= Cheng rotation vane =

Fluid flow conditioning device

A fluid flow conditioning device, the cheng rotation vane (CRV) is a stationary vane fabricated within a pipe piece as a single unit and welded directly upstream of an elbow before the pump inlet, flow meters, compressors, or other downstream equipment.

The cheng rotation vane is used to eliminate elbow induced turbulence, cavitation, erosion, vibration, which effect pump performance, seal life, impeller life, lead to bearing failure, flow meter accuracy, pipe bursts, and other common pipe problems.
