= Coram Children's Legal Centre =

UK charity

Coram Children's Legal Centre (CCLC) is a UK charity founded in 1981 that works to promote children's rights both in the UK and abroad. The CCLC is funded by grants from central government, UNICEF, and charitable trusts, and donations. Coram Children's Legal Centre, part of the Coram group of charities, specialises in law and policy affecting children and young people. CCLC provides free legal information, advice and representation to children, young people, their families, carers and professionals, as well as international consultancy on child law and children's rights.

== Awards ==
Coram Children's Legal Centre was the recipient of the 2009 Gandhi Foundation's Peace Award.
