= Ramzi Aburedwan =

Palestinian musician

Ramzi Aburedwan رمزي أبو رضوان
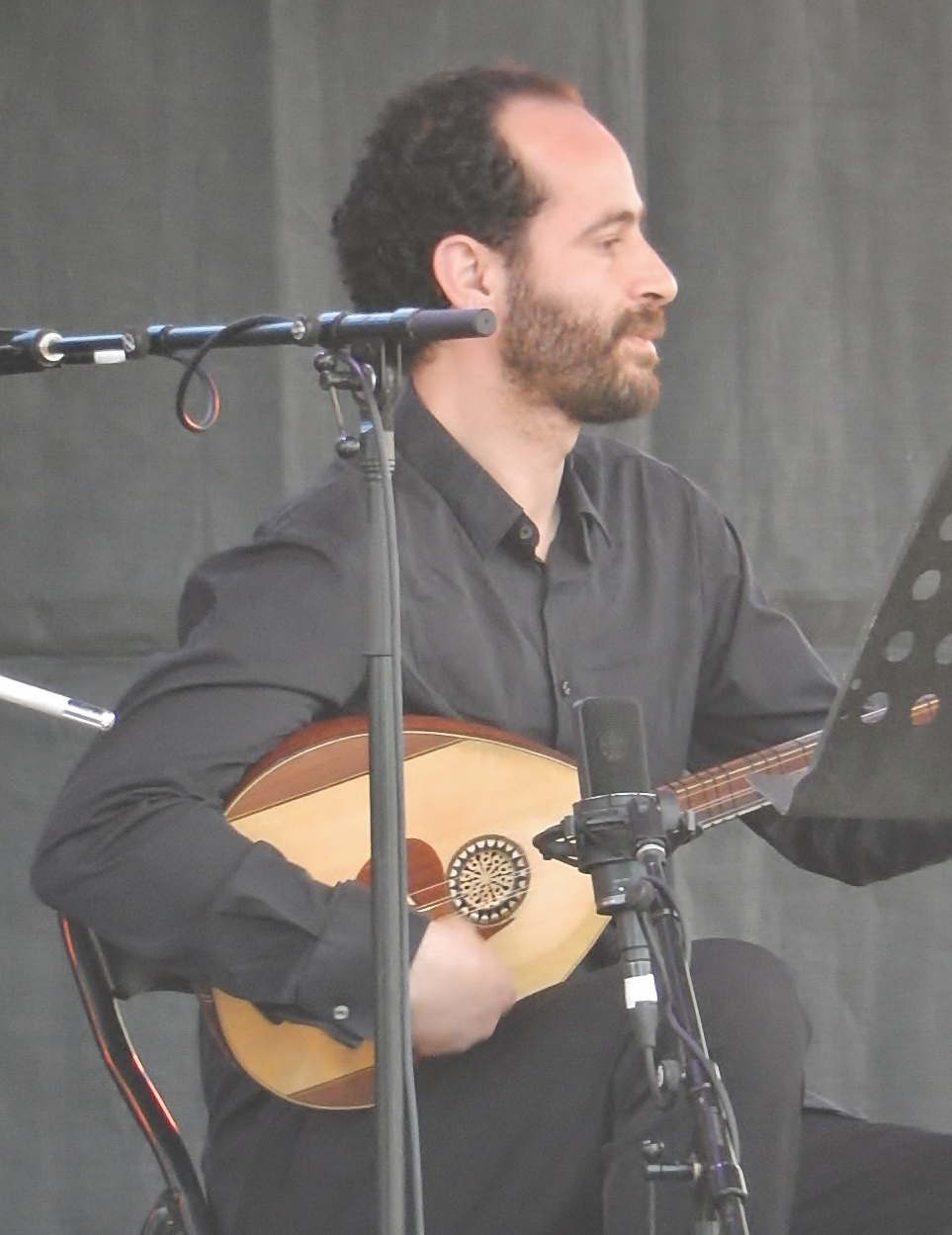

Background information
- Born: 1979 (age 46–47); Bethlehem, West Bank
- Genres: classical, folk
- Occupations: Musician, composer, educator
- Instruments: viola, buzuq
- Years active: 1998–present
- Website: www.ramziaburedwan.com

Ramzi Aburedwan (Arabic:رمزي أبو رضوان, born 1979) is a Palestinian composer, arranger, educator; and viola and buzuq player. He is the founder of Ensemble Dal’Ouna and the Palestine National Ensemble of Arabic Music. He founded the al Kamandjâti music centre and has collaborated with international and renowned musicians. He first studied at the Edward Said National Conservatory of Music and then in the Regional Conservatory of Angers (France). Documentaries have been made of his life, including Its Not a Gun (2005) and Just Play (2012). He is the main subject of the book Children of the Stone: The Power of Music in a Hard Land by Sandy Tolan (2015).

== Biography ==
Aburedwan was born in Bethlehem in 1979 and raised in the Am'ari refugee camp in Ramallah. As an eight-year-old he participated in the first intifada and became an inspiration due to a widely circulated photograph showing him poised to throw a stone at a tank. He lost a brother, a cousin, and many of his friends during the intifada.

In October 2002 he founded Al Kamandjâti ("the violinist") Association, which aims to bring classical music to impoverished Palestinian children.

In 2010 he founded the Palestine National Ensemble of Arabic Music, a 30-member ensemble which performs classical Arabic music and original compositions. In 2012 he released his solo album, Reflections of Palestine, described by David Maine as folk-inflected instrumental music.

== The different projects of Ramzi Aburedwan ==
=== The Palestine National Ensemble for Arabic Music (PNEAM) ===
Created in 2010 by Aburedwan, who also serves as its musical director, The Palestine National Ensemble for Arabic Music (PNEAM) is playing classical Arab musical heritage in Palestine. The 25-30 members of the ensemble, through live performances, renders classical Arabic music traditions accessible to Palestinian audiences of all walks of life.

=== Dal'Ouna Ensemble ===
Ramzi founded Dal’Ouna in 2000, while living in Angers, thus laying the base for a Franco-Arab fusion band. Dal’ouna’s core members include Ramzi on bouzouq and viola, Ziad Ben Youssef (Tunisia/France) on oud and percussion, Edwin Buger (ex-Yugoslavia/France) on accordion and keys, and Tareq Rentisi (Palestine) on percussion. The ensemble has released four albums. The new repertoire Dal'Ouna is paying tribute to Ramzi's ancestors, the Natufians.

=== Al Manara Ensemble ===
Al Manara (meaning The Beacon) is a Belgian-Palestinian ensemble built between Aburedwan and the Belgian pianist, conductor and composer Éloi Baudimont. The ensemble has toured France, Belgium and Palestine and released one CD.

=== Jerusalem Sufi Ensemble ===
The Jerusalem Sufi Ensemble is dedicated to the documentation and revival of Sufi traditions. The voice-centered tradition is here enhanced by an ensemble that includes bouzouq, oud, qanun, nay and percussion.The ensemble’s current performance project, titled “Forgiveness,” explores an international body of Sufi poetry that includes Mansur Al-Hallaj (Persia), Muhammed Ibn-Arabi (Andalusia), Jalal Ad-Din Muhammad Rumi (Persia), Imam Al-Busiri (Morocco & Egypt), Baha-ud-Din Naqshband Bukhari (Bukhara) and Ibn Al-Farid (Syria & Egypt).

=== Arab-Andalusian Orchestra from Anjou ===
Conducted by Aburedwan, the Arab-Andalusian Orchestra is made up of artists from all over Anjou, of all ages. They have a repertoire ranging from the Levant (Middle East) to Eastern Europe via Africa and Asia. The themes addressed revolve around the Andalusian lyrical imagination, and are conveyed through courtly love, wine, and gardens.

=== Other projects ===
Aburedwan has composed and arranged for orchestra for the World Sacred music festival of Fes under the artistic direction of Alain Weber in 2016, 2017, 2018, 2019 and 2022.

Aburedwan is also the music director of two performances presented at the Philharmonie of Paris: "Tribute to the Great Divas", featuring songs from Umm Kulthum, Fairuz, Asmahan, Leila Mourad, Mayada Alhenawy, Warda al Djazaïra, and "Ma valise est mon pays", tribute to the poet Mahmoud Darwish with on stage Kamilya Jubran, Rodolphe Burger and Rachida Brakni.

== Discography ==
- Reflections of Palestine (2012)
- Marvels of the Arab world (Live) (2018)

== Works cited ==
- Belkind, Nili (2014). Music in Conflict: Palestine, Israel, and the Politics of Aesthetic Production (Thesis). Columbia University.
