= Counter-Revolutionary Violence: Bloodbaths in Fact & Propaganda =

1973 book by Noam Chomsky and Edward S. Herman

- Authors: Edward S. Herman; Noam Chomsky
- Language: English
- Subject: Foreign policy of the United States
- Publisher: Warner Modular Publications, Inc.
- Publication date: 1973
- Publication place: United States
- Media type: Print
- Preceded by: American Power and the New Mandarins
- Followed by: The Political Economy of Human Rights

Counter-Revolutionary Violence: Bloodbaths in Fact & Propaganda is a 1973 book by Noam Chomsky and Edward S. Herman, with a preface by Richard A. Falk. It presented the thesis that the "United States, in attempting to suppress revolutionary movements in underdeveloped countries, had become the leading source of violence against native people".

== Contents ==
Chomsky and Herman offer a critique of United States foreign policy in Indochina, with significant focus on the Vietnam War. They include sections on the My Lai Massacre, Operation Speedy Express, and the Phoenix Program.

Chomsky and Herman introduced a framework in Counter-Revolutionary Violence (CRV) that became a hallmark of their work, which classified bloodbaths (and terrorist activities) in these categories of Washington, D.C., and the media's regard:

- Benign: East Pakistan in 1971, Burundi in 1972;
- Constructive: Indonesia in 1965–1966; France in Vietnam, 1950s; Diem regime in Vietnam, 1950s; the United States in Vietnam, 1960s; the United States in the Philippines, periodically from 1898 to when CRV was printed in 1973; the United States in Cambodia from the Lon Nol coup in 1970 to when CRV was printed in 1973;
- Nefarious: Vietnamese revolutionary, 1950s and 1960s;
- Mythical: North Vietnamese land reform in the 1950s; North Vietnamese in Huế in 1968.

Chomsky and Herman argued that the American treatment of bloodbaths was related to their political utility, regardless of the objective facts of such murders. Benign bloodbaths were those in which the United States' political establishment had little strategic interest and were often committed by friendly nations (and the United States regularly supplied the regimes committing the murders), constructive bloodbaths had strongly favorable results for American (primarily corporate) interests, nefarious bloodbaths were conducted by official enemies, and mythical bloodbaths either never happened or were minor events inflated into legendary status by government and media exaggeration.

== Publishing history ==
The work was published by Warner Modular Publications, a subsidiary of Warner Communications in 1973. The head of Warner Publishing wanted to stop the publication of the book, and Warner Modular was shut down as a result.

Warner Modular initially agreed to print 20,000 copies of the book. Warner Modular's publisher, Claude McCaleb, had spent his career publishing books for universities, and CRV was planned as part of a series of works that studied American institutions, which McCaleb believed would be timely after the Watergate scandal. Warner Modular had prepared ads to run in various periodicals that promoted CRV, in anticipation of an upcoming convention of the American Sociological Association in New York City.

According to McCaleb, in an affidavit to Chomsky and Herman quoted in Ben Bagdikian's The Media Monopoly, on August 27, 1973, the chief of book operations at Warner Communications, William Sarnoff, nephew of David Sarnoff, saw the ads come across his desk and called McCaleb's office in Andover, Massachusetts and Sarnoff asked if CRV would be another Pentagon Papers that would embarrass Warner. McCaleb replied that it was not a document leak, but was an analysis of public material by two established academics. Two hours later, Sarnoff called again and asked McCaleb to fly that night and bring an advance copy of the book to his office in New York City. In the morning McCaleb sent the manuscript to Sarnoff's office. Within a few hours, Sarnoff asked McCaleb to come to his office. McCaleb said that Sarnoff attacked him for having published Counter-Revolutionary Violence, which Sarnoff described as "a pack of lies, a scurrilous attack on respected Americans, undocumented, a publication unworthy of a serious publisher".

McCaleb reminded Sarnoff that, when McCaleb was hired, he and his staff were given discretion to select what to publish. Sarnoff dismissed McCaleb's argument by stating that the arrangement did not cover works that were "worthless and full of lies." Sarnoff complained that too many of Warner Modular's works were written by left-wing writers. McCaleb replied that conservative writers were also represented, and that Warner Modular had planned to publish works by Milton Friedman and Friedrich Hayek.

Sarnoff then canceled the ads for CRV, ordered the destruction of the first printing of CRV, as well as the Warner Modular catalog that listed them, and announced that he would not release one copy of CRV to anybody. When McCaleb replied that such an outrageous move would shatter Warner Modular's staff and shock the publishing world, Sarnoff replied that he did not "give a damn what I, my staff, the authors, or the academic community thought and ended by saying that we should destroy the entire inventory of CRV".

Warner Publishing decided to shut down Warner Modular before CRV could be published. The print run was not initially destroyed because of contractual obligations, but the book was passed on to MSS Information Corporation for promotion and distribution after Warner Publishing shut down Warner Modular. However, MSS engaged in no promotion, as it was not a commercial publishing company and had no distribution facilities. Only 500 copies of the 20,000-copy printing survived. Radical America obtained and distributed some copies, because its staff already knew of CRV's existence. According to Chomsky, the rest were "pulped," not burned.

Despite its suppression in the United States, it was translated into several European languages, had two printings in France by the time that The Washington Connection was printed, and CRV's suppression became a "minor cause celebre" in France.

The work is the foundation of the authors' much expanded two-volume The Political Economy of Human Rights, published in 1979.

== See also ==
- Manufacturing Consent: The Political Economy of the Mass Media
