= Dan Kovalik =

American lawyer (born 1968)

- Born: Daniel Kovalik; 1968 (age 57–58); Louisville, Kentucky, U.S.
- Education: Columbia University (JD)
- Occupations: Lawyer; Professor; Writer; Author
- Years active: 1987–present
- Spouse: Christine Haas

Daniel Kovalik (born 1968) is an American human rights, labor rights lawyer and political activist. He previously taught International Human Rights at the University of Pittsburgh School of Law.

== Education and work ==
Kovalik graduated from Columbia Law School in 1993. He then served as in-house counsel for the United Steelworkers, AFL-CIO (USW) until 2019. While with the USW, he worked on Alien Tort Claims Act cases against The Coca-Cola Company, Drummond and Occidental Petroleum – cases arising out of egregious human rights abuses in Colombia.

Kovalik received the David W. Mills Mentoring Fellowship from Stanford University School of Law. He was the recipient of the Project Censored Award for his article exposing the unprecedented killing of trade unionists in Colombia.

He has written extensively on the issue of international human rights and US foreign policy for the CounterPunch and The Huffington Post and has lectured throughout the world on these subjects.

He is the author of several books, his first book was, The Plot to Scapegoat Russia, was published in 2017 by Skyhorse Publishing. He was co-author of the book No More War: How the West Violates International Law by Using 'Humanitarian' Intervention to Advance Economic and Strategic Interests, which was published in 2020. His book "The Plot To Overthrow Venezuela, How The US Is Orchestrating a Coup for Oil" includes a foreword by Oliver Stone. In 2024 The Case for Palestine, Why It Matters and Why You Should Care, with a foreword by George Galloway, was published.

=== Colombia ===
He worked on the Alien Tort Claims Act cases against The Coca-Cola Company, Drummond Company and Occidental Petroleum over human rights abuses in Colombia. Kovalik accused the United States of intervention in Colombia, saying it has threatened peaceful actors there so it may "make Colombian land secure for massive appropriation and exploitation". He also accused the Colombian and United States governments of overseeing mass killings in Colombia between 2002 and 2009.

In October 2025, He was appointed Gustavo Petro's lawyer in the US after Gustavo Petro was sanctioned by the US over allegations of drug dealing

=== Venezuela ===
Kovalik defended the Venezuelan government following both the 2014 Venezuelan protests and the Venezuela Defense of Human Rights and Civil Society Act of 2014 law enacted by the United States allowing the sanctioning of individuals who allegedly violated the human rights of Venezuelans. In a radio interview with Matt Dwyer about Venezuela's 2013 elections, Kovalik called the Bolivarian Revolution "the most benevolent revolution in history". On 26 February 2014, he attended the "Chávez Was Here" gathering created by the Embassy of Venezuela, Washington, D.C. to commemorate the presidency of Hugo Chávez and to show support for the Bolivarian Revolution. At the gathering, Kovalik spoke beside the Venezuelan ambassador Julio Escalona and economist Mark Weisbrot.

=== Russia and Ukraine ===
Kovalik is supportive of the Russian government in the Russo-Ukrainian War and has defended the Russian invasion of Ukraine. In a 2022 column for the Pittsburgh Post-Gazette, he wrote that the 2014 Euromaidan was a "coup" led by the United States and the Ukrainian military, in particular the far-right elements such as the Azov Battalion, targeted civilians in the Donbas prior to the full-scale invasion. The Ukraine Crisis Media Center wrote that Kovalik's views contradicted his human rights activism, "bordering on conspiracy theories", and "correlating with the rhetoric of the Russian Federation".

He visited Russia and Russian-occupied Crimea. Kovalik has appeared on Russian state media RT and has written a book titled The Plot to Scapegoat Russia about "the decades-long effort to escalate hostilities with Russia".

=== Israel and Gaza ===
During the Gaza war, Kovalik is supportive of a humanitarian ceasefire. At a campaign event for Sara Innamorato at Shorty's restaurant in West Homestead, Pennsylvania on October 29, 2023, he was kicked out of the event after asking Senator John Fetterman why he did not support a ceasefire between Israel and Hamas.
