= Gaddafi (name) =

Gaddafi, Gadhafi, or Qaddafi (Arabic: قذافي, Qaḏḏāfī) is a surname and given name.

== Surname ==
- Wanis al-Qaddafi (1924–1986), a Prime Minister of Libya from 1968 to 1969
- Muammar Kaddafi (1942–2011), Libya's leader from 1969 to 2011
  - Muhammad Gaddafi (born 1970), eldest son of Muammar
  - Saif al-Islam Gaddafi (1972–2026), son of Muammar
  - Al-Saadi Gaddafi (born 1973), son of Muammar, soccer player
  - Hannibal Muammar Gaddafi (born 1975), son of Muammar
  - Ayesha Gaddafi (born 1976), daughter of Muammar
  - Mutassim Gaddafi (1977–2011), son of Muammar
  - Saif al-Arab Gaddafi (1982–2011), son of Muammar
  - Khamis Gaddafi (1983–2011), son of Muammar
  - Ahmed Gaddaf al-Dam (born 1952), cousin of Muammar
  - Sayyid Gaddaf al-Dam (1948–2023), cousin of Muammar
- Moussa Ibrahim Gaddafi, Information Minister during the Libyan Civil War

== Given name ==
- Khadaffy Janjalani (1975–2006), leader of the Abu Sayyaf militant group
- Khadafi Gou (born 1977), Cuban footballer

== See also ==
- Qadhadhfa or Gaddafa, the Libyan tribe derived name
- Yaki Kadafi (1977–1996), American rapper
- Tragedy Khadafi, American rapper
