= Al Kamandjâti =

Nonprofit organization offering music lessons to Palestinian children

Al Kamandjâti is a nonprofit organization that is offering music lessons to Palestinian children, and had given them a chance to make their appearances in orchestras in the region and some European countries. The organization has its seat in Ramallah.

The organization focuses on children in refugee camps and in villages on the West Bank, the Gaza Strip and Southern Lebanon. The goal of the organization is to have children discover cultural heritage in general and develop creative skills, so they are kept away from throwing stones and acquiring violent habits.

Al Kamandjâti was founded in France in October 2002 by violist Ramzi Aburedwan. He was inspired to do so when he was still a boy, because his little friend had been killed by Israeli soldiers. As a reaction he threw back stones, of which photographs were made that were shown all over the world.

In 2006 the organization was honored with a Prince Claus Award from the Netherlands.
