= Towards a New Cold War =

1982 book by Noam Chomsky

- Author: Noam Chomsky
- Publication date: 1982
- ISBN: 978-1565848597

Towards a New Cold War: Essays on the Current Crisis and How We Got There is a 1982 book by Noam Chomsky. It is an extensive exploration of American foreign policy during the late Vietnam War era up until the start of Reagan's presidency.

== Reception ==
Writing in The Boston Phoenix, Mac Margolis felt that the book "is not easy reading, and it's by no means a good read. Deliberate, plodding, often pedagogical, Chomsky acts as a lawyer for the indigent nations, filing motion after motion. All this is exhaustively documented; the sum total is almost numbing. The structure of the book is similarly maddening. You are always flipping ahead to the voluminous notes or back through the thicket of cross references to earlier chapters."
