= Propaganda model =

Conceptual model in political economy

The propaganda model is a conceptual model in political economy advanced by Edward S. Herman and Noam Chomsky to explain how propaganda and systemic biases function in corporate mass media. The model seeks to explain how populations are manipulated and how consent for economic, social, and political policies, both foreign and domestic, is "manufactured" in the public mind due to this propaganda. The theory posits that the way in which corporate media is structured (e.g. through advertising, concentration of media ownership or government sourcing) creates an inherent conflict of interest and therefore acts as propaganda for anti-democratic elements.

First presented in their 1988 book Manufacturing Consent: The Political Economy of the Mass Media, the propaganda model views corporate media as businesses interested in the sale of a product—readers and audiences—to other businesses (advertisers) rather than the pursuit of quality journalism in service of the public. Describing the media's "societal purpose", Chomsky writes, "... the study of institutions and how they function must be scrupulously ignored, apart from fringe elements or a relatively obscure scholarly literature". The theory postulates five general classes of "filters" that determine the type of news that is presented in news media. These five classes are: ownership of the medium, the medium's funding sources, sourcing, flak, and anti-communism or "fear ideology". By the late 2000s, the anti-communism filter was viewed as having been replaced by an "anti-terrorist" war on terror or islamophic filter.

Although the model was based mainly on the media of the United States, Chomsky and Herman believe the theory is equally applicable to any country that shares the basic economic structure and organizing principles that the model postulates as the cause of media biases. Their assessment has been supported by a number of scholars and the propaganda role of the media has since been empirically assessed in Western Europe and Latin America.

== Filters ==
Herman and Chomsky's model includes five filters: ownership; advertising as the primary income source; sourcing; "flak"; and "anticommunism".

=== Ownership ===
The first filter is ownership. The size and profit-seeking imperative of dominant media corporations create a bias. Herman and Chomsky argue that in the early nineteenth century, a radical British press emerged that addressed the concerns of workers. Libel law and stamp duties were used to attempt to protect the elites holding political power, but were ineffective. A big increase in the practical cost of running a newspaper with a "substantial outrech", including machinery, became a much stronger constraint against creating new newspapers. There remained a degree of diversity. The authors posit that these earlier radical papers were not constrained by corporate ownership and therefore, were free to criticize the capitalist system.

Herman and Chomsky argue that since mainstream media outlets of the early twenty-first century are either large corporations or part of conglomerates (e.g. Westinghouse or General Electric), the information presented to the public will be biased with respect to these interests. Such conglomerates frequently extend beyond traditional media fields and thus have extensive financial interests that may be endangered when certain information is publicized. According to this reasoning, news items that most endanger the corporate financial interests of those who own the media will face the greatest bias and censorship.

It then follows that if to maximize profit means sacrificing news objectivity, then the news sources that ultimately survive must be fundamentally biased, with regard to news in which they have a conflict of interest.

=== Advertising ===
The second filter of the propaganda model is funding generated through advertising. Most newspapers have to attract advertising in order to cover the costs of production; without it, they would have to increase the price of their newspaper. There is fierce competition throughout the media to attract advertisers; a newspaper which gets less advertising than its competitors is at a serious disadvantage. Lack of success in raising advertising revenue was another factor in the demise of the 'people's newspapers' of the nineteenth and twentieth centuries.

The product is composed of the affluent readers who buy the newspaper—who also comprise the educated decision-making sector of the population—while the actual clientele served by the newspaper includes the businesses that pay to advertise their goods. According to this filter, the news is "filler" to get privileged readers to see the advertisements which makes up the content and will thus take whatever form is most conducive to attracting educated decision-makers. Stories that conflict with their "buying mood", it is argued, will tend to be marginalized or excluded, along with information that presents a picture of the world that collides with advertisers' interests. The theory argues that the people buying the newspaper are the product which is sold to the businesses that buy advertising space; the news has only a marginal role as the product.

In post World War II Britain, radical or worker-friendly newspapers such as the Daily Herald, News Chronicle, Sunday Citizen (all since failed or absorbed into other publications), and the Daily Mirror (at least until the late 1970s) regularly published articles questioning the capitalist system.

=== Sourcing ===
The third of Herman and Chomsky's five filters relates to the sourcing of mass media news: "The mass media are drawn into a symbiotic relationship with powerful sources of information by economic necessity and reciprocity of interest." Herman and Chomsky argue that large media corporations such as the BBC cannot afford to place reporters everywhere. They concentrate their resources where news stories are likely to happen: the White House, the Pentagon, 10 Downing Street and other central news "terminals". Although British newspapers may occasionally complain about the "spin-doctoring" of New Labour, for example, they are dependent upon the pronouncements of "the Prime Minister's personal spokesperson" for government news. Business corporations and trade organizations are also trusted sources of stories considered newsworthy. Editors and journalists who offend these powerful news sources, perhaps by questioning the veracity or bias of the furnished material, can be threatened with the denial of access to their media life-blood - fresh news. Thus, the media are reluctant to run articles that will harm corporate interests that provide them with the resources that they depend upon.

This relationship also gives rise to a "moral division of labor" where "officials have and give the facts" and "reporters merely get them". Journalists are then supposed to adopt an uncritical attitude that makes it possible for them to accept corporate values without experiencing cognitive dissonance.

=== Flak ===
The fourth filter is 'flak' (not to be confused with flack which means promoters or publicity agents), described by Herman and Chomsky as "negative responses to a media statement or [TV or radio] program [that] may take the form of letters, telegrams, phone calls, petitions, lawsuits, speeches and bills before Congress and other modes of complaint, threat and punitive action". Business organizations regularly come together to form flak machines. An example is the US-based Global Climate Coalition (GCC), comprising fossil fuel and automobile companies such as Exxon, Texaco and Ford. The GCC was conceived by Burson-Marsteller, one of the world's largest public relations companies, to attack the credibility of climate scientists and 'scare stories' about global warming.

For Chomsky and Herman "flak" refers to negative responses to a media statement or program. The term "flak" has been used to describe what Chomsky and Herman see as efforts to discredit organizations or individuals who disagree with or cast doubt on the prevailing assumptions which Chomsky and Herman view as favorable to established power (e.g., "The Establishment"). Unlike the first three "filtering" mechanisms—which are derived from analysis of market mechanisms—flak is characterized by concerted efforts to manage public information.

=== Anti-Communism and fear ===
So I think when we talked about the "fifth filter" we should have brought in all this stuff -- the way artificial fears are created with a dual purpose... partly to get rid of people you don't like but partly to frighten the rest. Because if people are frightened, they will accept authority.

— Noam Chomsky

The fifth news filter that Herman and Chomsky identified was 'anti-communism'. Manufacturing Consent was written during the Cold War. Chomsky updated the model as "fear", often as 'the enemy' or an 'evil dictator' such as Colonel Gaddafi, Paul Biya, Saddam Hussein, Slobodan Milosevic, or Vladimir Putin. This is exemplified in British tabloid headlines of 'Smash Saddam!' and 'Clobba Slobba!'. The same is said to extend to mainstream reporting of environmentalists as 'eco-terrorists'. The Sunday Times ran a series of articles in 1999 accusing activists from the non-violent direct action group Reclaim The Streets of stocking up on CS gas and stun guns.

Anti-ideologies exploit public fear and hatred of groups that pose a potential threat, either real, exaggerated or imagined. Communism once posed the primary threat according to the model. Communism and socialism were portrayed by their detractors as endangering freedoms of speech, movement, the press and so forth. They argue that such a portrayal was often used as a means to silence voices critical of elite interests. Chomsky argues that since the end of the Cold War (1991), anticommunism was replaced by the "war on terror", as the major social control mechanism: "Anti-communism has receded as an ideological factor in the Western media, but it is not dead... The 'war on terror' has provided a useful substitute for the Soviet Menace." Following the events of September 11, 2001, some scholars agree that Islamophobia is replacing anti-communism as a new source of public fear. Herman and Chomsky noted, in an interview given in 2009, that the popularity of 'anti-communism' as a news filter is slowly decreasing in favor of other more contemporary ideologies such as 'anti-terrorism'.

== Coverage of "enemy" countries ==
[The polls] show that all of the opposition parties in Nicaragua combined had the support of only 9 percent of the population, but they have 100 percent of Stephen Kinzer.

— Noam Chomsky

Examples of bias given by the authors include the failure of the media to question the legality of the Vietnam War while greatly emphasizing the Soviet–Afghan War as an act of aggression.

Other biases include a propensity to emphasize violent acts such as genocide more in enemy or unfriendly countries such as Kosovo while ignoring greater genocide in allied countries such as the Indonesian occupation of East Timor. This bias is also said to exist in foreign elections, giving favorable media coverage to fraudulent elections in allied countries such as El Salvador and Guatemala, while unfavorable coverage is given to legitimate elections in enemy countries such as Nicaragua.

A study found that in the lead up to the Iraq War, most sources were overwhelmingly in favor of the invasion.

Chomsky also asserts that the media accurately covered events such as the Battle of Fallujah but because of an ideological bias, it acted as pro-government propaganda. In describing coverage of raid on Fallujah General Hospital he stated that The New York Times, "accurately recorded the battle of Fallujah but it was celebrated... it was a celebration of ongoing war crimes". The article in question was "Early Target of Offensive Is a Hospital".

== Coverage of scandals and leaks ==
Chomsky has argued that the different coverage of scandals and leaks demonstrates the propaganda model. In interviews from 1990 to 1996, he argued that the public revelations of the Watergate scandal and COINTELPRO happened at around the same time, allowing for a "controlled experiment" of news coverage of both scandals. Chomsky argued that the COINTELPRO revelations were much more important because the government targeted groups without political power, during multiple presidents, and yet these revelations received little coverage. By not focusing on the more serious abuses of power, Chomsky argues that it served the interests of the powerful. In an interview with Andrew Marr, Chomsky added that he himself was on Nixon's "enemies list" and yet it had no effect on his life.

In a 2010 interview, Chomsky compared media coverage of the Afghan War Diaries and lack of media coverage of a study of severe health problems in Fallujah . While there was ample coverage of the Afghan War Diaries, there was no American coverage of the Fallujah study, in which the health situation in Fallujah was described by the British media as "worse than Hiroshima". Chomsky argued that the severe health problems were much more significant than the Afghanistan revelations as news but received little to no coverage.

== Further Applications ==
Since the publication of Manufacturing Consent, Herman and Chomsky have adopted the theory and have given it a prominent role in their writings, lectures and theoretical frameworks. Chomsky has made extensive use of its explanative power to lend support to his interpretations of mainstream media attitudes towards a wide array of events, including the following:

- Gulf War (1990), the media's failure to report on Saddam's peace offers.
- Iraq invasion (2003), the media's failure to report on the legality of the war despite overwhelming public opinion in favor of only invading Iraq with UN authorization. According to the liberal watchdog group Fairness and Accuracy In Reporting, there was a disproportionate focus on pro-war sources while total anti-war sources only made up 10% of the media (with only 3% of US sources being anti-war).
- Global warming, a 2004 study found that the media gives near equal balance to people who deny climate change despite only "about one percent" of climate scientists taking this view. Chomsky commented that there are "three sides" on climate change (deniers, those who follow the scientific consensus, and people who think that the consensus underestimates the threat from global warming), but in framing the debate the media usually ignore people who say that the scientific consensus is unduly optimistic.

== Reception ==
On the rare occasions the propaganda model is discussed in the mainstream media there is usually a large reaction. In 1988, when Chomsky was interviewed by Bill Moyers, there were 1,000 letters in response, one of the biggest written reactions in the show's history. When he was interviewed by TV Ontario, the show generated 31,321 call-ins, which was a new record for the station. In 1996, when Chomsky was interviewed by Andrew Marr the producer commented that the response was "astonishing". He commented that "[t]he audience reaction was astonishing... I have never worked on a programme which elicited so many letters and calls".

In May 2007, Chomsky and Herman spoke at the University of Windsor in Canada summarizing developments and responding to criticisms related to the model. Both authors stated they felt the propaganda model is still applicable (Herman said even more so than when it was introduced), although they did suggest a few areas where they believe it falls short and needs to be extended in light of recent developments.

Chomsky has insisted that while the propaganda role of the media "is intensified by ownership and advertising" the problem mostly lies with "ideological-doctrinal commitments that are part of intellectual life" or intellectual culture of the people in power. He compares the media to scholarly literature which he says has the same problems even without the constraints of the propaganda model.

At the Windsor talk, Chomsky pointed out that Edward S. Herman was primarily responsible for creating the theory although Chomsky supported it. According to Chomsky, he insisted Herman's name appear first on the cover of Manufacturing Consent because of his primary role researching and developing the theory.

=== Harvard media torture study ===
From the early 1930s until...2004, the newspapers that covered waterboarding almost uniformly called the practice torture or implied it was torture: The New York Times characterized it thus in 81.5% (44 of 54) of articles on the subject and the Los Angeles Times did so in 96.3% of articles (26 of 27). By contrast, from 2002‐2008, the studied newspapers almost never referred to waterboarding as torture.

— Desai et al.

In April 2010, a study conducted by the Harvard Kennedy School showed that media outlets such as The New York Times and Los Angeles Times stopped using the term "torture" for waterboarding when the US government committed it, from 2002 to 2008. It also noted that the press was "much more likely to call waterboarding torture if a country other than the United States is the perpetrator." The study was similar to media studies done in Manufacturing Consent for topics such as comparing how the term "genocide" is used in the media when referring to allied and enemy countries. Glenn Greenwald said that "We don't need a state-run media because our media outlets volunteer for the task..." and commented that the media often act as propaganda for the government without coercion.

=== Studies of media outside the United States ===
Chomsky has commented in the "ChomskyChat Forum" on the applicability of the Propaganda Model to the media environment of other countries:

That's only rarely been done in any systematic way. There is work on the British media, by a good U[niversity] of Glasgow media group. And interesting work on British Central America coverage by Mark Curtis in his book Ambiguities of Power. There is work on France, done in Belgium mostly, also a recent book by Serge Halimi (editor of Le Monde diplomatique). There is one very careful study by a Dutch graduate student, applying the methods Ed Herman used in studying US media reaction to elections (El Salvador, Nicaragua) to 14 major European newspapers. ... Interesting results. Discussed a bit (along with some others) in a footnote in chapter 5 of my book Deterring Democracy, if you happen to have that around.

For more than a decade, a British-based website Media Lens has examined their domestic broadcasters and liberal press. Its criticisms are featured in the books Guardians of Power (2006) and Newspeak in the 21st Century (2009).

Studies have also expanded the propaganda model to examine news media in the People's Republic of China and for film production in Hollywood.

==== News of the World ====
In July 2011, the journalist Paul Mason, then working for the BBC, pointed out that the News International phone hacking scandal threw light on close links between the press and politicians. However, he argued that the closure of the mass-circulation newspaper News of the World, which took place after the scandal broke, conformed only partly to the propaganda model. He drew attention to the role of social media, saying that "large corporations pulled their advertising" because of the "scale of the social media response" (a response which was mainly to do with the newspaper's behaviour towards Milly Dowler, although Mason did not go into this level of detail).

Mason praised The Guardian for having told the truth about the phone-hacking, but expressed doubt about the financial viability of the newspaper.

One part of the Chomsky doctrine has been proven by exception. He stated that newspapers that told the truth could not make money. The Guardian...is indeed burning money and may run out of it in three years' time.

== Criticism ==
The propaganda model has received criticism, including accusations of being a conspiracy theory, being a solely structural model that does not "analyze the practical, mundane or organizational aspects of newsroom work", being analogous to the "gatekeeper model" of mass media, failing to "theorize audience effects", assuming "the existence of a unified ruling class", and being "highly deterministic".

=== The Anti-Chomsky Reader ===
Eli Lehrer of the American Enterprise Institute criticized the theory in The Anti-Chomsky Reader. According to Lehrer, the fact that papers like The New York Times and The Wall Street Journal have disagreements is evidence that the media is not a monolithic entity. Lehrer also believes that the media cannot have a corporate bias because it reports on and exposes corporate corruption. Lehrer asserts that the model amounts to a Marxist conception of right-wing false consciousness.

Herman and Chomsky have asserted that the media "is not a solid monolith" but that it represents a debate between powerful interests while ignoring perspectives that challenge the "fundamental premises" of all these interests. For instance, during the Vietnam War there was disagreement among the media over tactics, but the broader issue of the legality and legitimacy of the war was ignored (see Coverage of "enemy" countries). Chomsky has said that while the media are against corruption, they are not against society legally empowering corporate interests which is a reflection of the powerful interests that the model would predict. The authors have also said that the model does not seek to address "the effects of the media on the public" which might be ineffective at shaping public opinion. Edward Herman has said "critics failed to comprehend that the propaganda model is about how the media work, not how effective they are".

=== Inroads: A Journal of Opinion ===
Gareth Morley argues in an article in Inroads: A Journal of Opinion that widespread coverage of Israeli mistreatment of protesters as compared with little coverage of similar (or much worse) events in sub-Saharan Africa is poorly explained. This was in response to Chomsky's assertion that in testing the Model, examples should be carefully paired to control reasons for discrepancies not related to political bias. Chomsky himself cites the examples of government mis-treatment of protesters and points out that general coverage of the two areas compared should be similar, raising the point that they are not: news from Israel (in any form) is far more common than news from sub-Saharan Africa. Morley considers this approach dubiously empirical.

=== The New York Times review ===
Writing for The New York Times, the historian Walter LaFeber criticized the book Manufacturing Consent for overstating its case, in particular with regards to reporting on Nicaragua and not adequately explaining how a powerful propaganda system would let military aid to the Contra rebels be blocked. Herman responded in a letter by stating that the system was not "all powerful" and that LaFeber did not address their main point regarding Nicaragua. LaFeber replied that:

Mr. Herman wants to have it both ways: to claim that leading American journals "mobilize bias" but object when I cite crucial examples that weaken the book's thesis. If the news media are so unqualifiedly bad, the book should at least explain why so many publications (including my own) can cite their stories to attack President Reagan's Central American policy.

Chomsky responds to LaFeber's reply in Necessary Illusions:

What is more, a propaganda model is not weakened by the discovery that with careful and critical reading, material could be unearthed in the media that could be used by those that objected to "President Reagan's Central American policy" on grounds of principle, opposing not its failures but its successes: the near destruction of Nicaragua and the blunting of the popular forces that threatened to bring democracy and social reform to El Salvador, among other achievements.

== See also ==
- Concentration of media ownership
- Corporate censorship
- Crowd manipulation
- Edward Bernays
- Fairness and Accuracy in Reporting
- Gatekeeping (communication)
- Mass psychology
- Politico-media complex
- Propaganda
  - Propaganda in the United States
  - Propaganda techniques
  - Protest paradigm
- Spin (public relations)
