= Edward S. Herman =

American journalist

Edward Samuel Herman
- Born: Edward Samuel Herman; April 7, 1925; Philadelphia, Pennsylvania, U.S.
- Died: November 11, 2017 (aged 92); Penn Valley, Pennsylvania, U.S.
- Education: University of Pennsylvania; University of California, Berkeley
- Occupations: Economist; media scholar; social critic
- Spouses: Mary Woody (m. 1946; died 2013) Christine Abbott (m. 2015)

Edward Samuel Herman (April 7, 1925 – November 11, 2017) was an American economist, media scholar and social critic. Herman is known for his media criticism, in particular the propaganda model hypothesis he developed with Noam Chomsky, a frequent co-writer. He held an appointment as professor emeritus of finance at the Wharton School of Business of the University of Pennsylvania. He also taught at Annenberg School for Communication at the University of Pennsylvania.

Ideologically, Herman has been described as a "dedicated radical democrat", an ideology which opposes corporate control in favor of direct democracy while distancing itself from other radical movements. His writings frequently dealt with what he called "Western corporate media reports" on violent regional conflicts, disputing mainstream reports to an extent that he has been criticised for downplaying genocide figures.

== Early life ==
Herman was born in Philadelphia to a liberal Democratic family, the son of Abraham Lincoln Herman, a pharmacist and Celia Dektor, a homemaker.

Herman received a Bachelor of Arts and a Master of Arts from the University of Pennsylvania. At University of California, Berkeley, from which he received his PhD in 1953, he met economist Robert A. Brady, a student of the economics of fascist regimes who had a significant influence upon him. Herman joined the Wharton School of Business of the University of Pennsylvania in 1958, where he taught finance and became professor emeritus in 1989.

== Political views ==
=== Vietnam War ===
Following the Vietnam War, Herman and Noam Chomsky challenged the veracity of media accounts of war crimes and repression by the Vietnamese communists, stating: "the basic sources for the larger estimates of killings in the North Vietnamese land reform were persons affiliated with the Central Intelligence Agency (CIA) or the Saigon Propaganda Ministry" and "the NLF-DRV 'bloodbath' at Hue (in South Vietnam) was constructed on flimsy evidence indeed". Commenting on postwar Vietnam, Chomsky and Herman argued: "[i]n a phenomenon that has few parallels in Western experience, there appear to have been close to zero retribution deaths in postwar Vietnam." This they described as a "miracle of reconciliation and restraint". In discussing the 1977 Congressional testimony of defecting SRV official Nguyen Cong Hoan, on the subjects of mass repression and the abrogation of civic and religious freedoms, Herman and Chomsky pointed to contradictory accounts of post-war Vietnam, concluding that while "some of what Hoan reports is no doubt accurate ... the many visitors and Westerners living in Vietnam who expressly contradict his claims" suggest "Hoan is simply not a reliable commentator."

Chomsky and Herman authored Counter-Revolutionary Violence: Bloodbaths in Fact & Propaganda, a book which criticised U.S. military involvement in Southeast Asia and highlighted how mainstream media neglected to cover stories about these activities; the publisher Warner Modular initially accepted it, and it was published in 1973. However, Warner Modular's parent company, Warner Communications, disapproved of the book's contents and ordered all copies to be destroyed. According to Jim Neilson's book Warring Fictions: Cultural Politics and the Vietnam War Narrative, the publication of Counter-Revolutionary Violence was stopped by an executive of Warner Publications, Robert Sarnoff, who thought its discussion of American foreign policy "was a pack of lies, a scurrilous attack on respected Americans, undocumented, a publication unworthy of a serious publisher". Because of a binding contract, copies were passed to another publisher rather than destroyed.

In 1967, Herman was among more than 500 writers and editors who signed the "Writers and Editors War Tax Protest" pledge, vowing to refuse to pay the 10% Vietnam War tax surcharge implemented by Congress upon the initiation of President Johnson.

=== Cambodia ===
Herman and Chomsky later collaborated on works about the media treatment of post-war Indochina, Cambodia in particular, beginning with "Distortions at Fourth Hand", an article written for the American left-wing periodical The Nation in June 1977. While they did not "pretend to know [...] the truth" about what was going on in Cambodia during the Khmer Rouge regime of Pol Pot, they believed, in reviewing material on the topic then available: "[w]hat filters through to the American public is a seriously distorted version of the evidence available". Referring to what they saw as "the extreme unreliability of refugee reports", they noted: "Refugees are frightened and defenseless, at the mercy of alien forces. They naturally tend to report what they believe their interlocutors wish to hear. While these reports must be considered seriously, care and caution are necessary. Specifically, refugees questioned by Westerners or Thais have a vested interest in reporting atrocities on the part of Cambodian revolutionaries, an obvious fact that no serious reporter will fail to take into account". They concluded by stating Khmer Rouge Cambodia might be more closely comparable to "France after liberation, where many thousands of people were massacred within a few months" than to Nazi Germany.

In 1979, Chomsky and Herman revised Counter-Revolutionary Violence and published it with South End Press as the two-volume The Political Economy of Human Rights. In this work they compared U.S. media reactions to the Cambodian genocide and the Indonesian occupation of East Timor. They argued that because Indonesia was a U.S. ally, U.S. media ignored the East Timorese situation while focusing on that in Cambodia, a U.S. enemy. Volume II of the book The Political Economy of Human Rights, Volume II: After the Cataclysm: Postwar Indochina and the Reconstruction of Imperial Ideology (1979), which appeared after the regime had been deposed, has been described by area specialist Sophal Ear as "one of the most supportive books of the Khmer revolution" in which they "perform what amounts to a defense of the Khmer Rouge cloaked in an attack on the media". In their book, Chomsky and Herman wrote: "The record of atrocities in Cambodia is substantial and often gruesome" but questioned their scale, which may have been inflated "by a factor of 100". They wrote that the evacuation of Phnom Penh "may actually have saved many lives", that the Khmer Rouge's agricultural policies reportedly produced positive results and there might have been "a significant degree of peasant support for the Khmer Rouge".

Herman replied to critics in 2001: "Chomsky and I found that the very asking of questions about the numerous fabrications, ideological role, and absence of any beneficial effects for the victims in the anti-Khmer Rouge propaganda campaign of 1975–1979 was unacceptable, and was treated almost without exception as 'apologetics for Pol Pot.'"

Todd Gitlin, in an email to The New York Times, wrote that for Herman and Chomsky "the suffering of the Cambodians is less important than their need to pin the damage done to Cambodia in the 1970s primarily on the American bombing that preceded the rise of the Khmer Rouge to power".

=== The "propaganda model" ===
Herman and Chomsky's best known co-authored book is Manufacturing Consent: The Political Economy of the Mass Media, first published in 1988, and largely written by Herman. The book introduced the notion of the "propaganda model" to the debates on the workings of the corporate media. They argued: "market forces, internalized assumptions and self-censorship" motivate newspapers and television networks to stifle dissent. They wrote: "in our model", the Polish priest Jerzy Popieluszko (a victim of the Communist state police) "murdered in an enemy state, will be a worthy victim, whereas priests murdered in our client states in Latin America will be unworthy. The former may be expected to elicit a propaganda outburst by the mass media, while the latter will not generate sustained coverage".

Rather than needing direct control over the media as in dictatorships, in the views of Herman and Chomsky, industrial democracies control popular opinion using "filters" which prevent politically controversial ideas from reaching the public. The two men specified five filters, in particular: the concentration of media ownership to a few corporations, the need to please advertisers and funding sources, the reliance on government-provided sources, flak, and anti-communist ideology. These influences combine to prevent politically inconvenient knowledge and ideas from reaching the general public.

Historian Walter LaFeber, reviewing the original 1988 edition for The New York Times, thought "their argument is sometimes weakened by overstatement" citing Herman and Chomsky's attack on major American news sources for reproducing false government assertions about Nicaragua but failing to note that those same sources quickly attacked the government when the deliberate error was discovered. Derek N. Shearer, also in 1988 for the Los Angeles Times, described the work as "important" and the "case studies" as "required reading" for foreign correspondents but in his view the authors "don't adequately explore the extent to which the mass media fail to manufacture consent, and why this might be so". To support his point, Shearer used the examples of the Contras in Nicaragua and the deposed Ferdinand Marcos in the Philippines, both supported by the US government and conservatives but not by American public opinion. Shearer also commented Herman and Chomsky "persuasively demonstrate that in countries where the American government is involved—either openly or covertly—the press is frequently less than critical, and sometimes a partner in outright deception of the American public."

"The whole approach of the book is deeply simplistic", according to Todd Gitlin, a professor of journalism and communications at Columbia University. "If you think that The New York Times is Pravda, which is essentially what they're saying, then what vocabulary do you have left for Fox News? Their model is so clumsy that it disables you from distinguishing between a straight-out propaganda network and a more complex, hegemonic mainstream news organ".

=== Writings on Srebrenica ===
Herman wrote about the 1995 Srebrenica massacre in articles such as "The Politics of the Srebrenica Massacre". He wrote: "the evidence for a massacre, certainly of one in which 8,000 men and boys were executed, has always been problematic, to say the least" and "the 'Srebrenica massacre' is the greatest triumph of propaganda to emerge from the Balkan wars... the link of this propaganda triumph to truth and justice is non-existent". He criticized the validity of the term genocide in the case of Srebrenica, alleging inconsistencies in the case of organized extermination such as the Bosnian Serb Army's bussing of Muslim women and children out of Srebrenica. In a 2004 review of Samantha Power's "A Problem from Hell": America and the Age of Genocide, Herman wrote: "It is truly Orwellian to see the [UN] Yugoslavia Tribunal struggling to pin the 'genocide' label on Milosevic and to have done that already against Bosnian Serb General Radislav Krstic." Krstić was convicted of aiding genocide for his role in the Srebrenica massacre and is serving 35 years for those charges.

Marko Attila Hoare criticized Herman's position on the Srebrenica massacre, claiming the Srebrenica Research Group was formed "to propagate the view that the Srebrenica massacre never happened". Michael F. Bérubé said the SRG is dedicated to overturning the findings of the International Criminal Tribunal for the former Yugoslavia. Herman's writings on the Srebrenica massacre were criticized by John Feffer and Oliver Kamm, who accused him in 2013 of "using bogus statistics for years", Martin Shaw who said he was "mediating denial", and the website Balkan Witness which accused him of "insulting the survivors". Starting from year 2000, the International Criminal Tribunal for the former Yugoslavia physically exhumed 8372 bodies of most of the Srebrenica massacre victims, which were then examined and most of identified by DNA analysis, confirming the fact of execution and its scale.

=== The Politics of Genocide ===
In The Politics of Genocide (co-authored by David Peterson, with a foreword by Noam Chomsky, 2010), Herman and Peterson argue "genocide" has become a politicized notion through analysis of the media and comparative studies of what they title "constructive" and "nefarious" genocides. They argue the Kosovo War, the Rwandan genocide in 1994, and the War in Darfur have been publicized as “genocides” in the West to advance an economic and intellectual agenda. They contrast media coverage of these events with Sanctions against Iraq and the Iraq War, arguing that despite similar casualties to those massacres which receive the label genocide, massacres in which Western powers were directly involved are not labelled “genocides”. By analyzing cases where the term "genocide" has been used, Herman argues the West has leveraged human rights abuses to advance its own agenda. He says this has resulted in a minority controlled government of pro-Western and pro-business Tutsi, while leading to the dismissal of Rwandan Patriotic Front (RPF) complicity in Central African mass killings during and following the Rwandan Civil War, bringing up evidence of RPF atrocities from sources such as the Gersony Report and the work of Allan C. Stam. "Genocides", such as East Timor, for which the West has some responsibility, have been largely ignored.

Journalists John Pilger and Dan Kovalik, recommended The Politics of Genocide. The book also received negative critical reactions, accusing the authors of denialism, from writers Gerald Caplan, George Monbiot, and James Wizeye, first secretary at the Rwandan High Commission in London. Genocide scholar Adam Jones criticized the account of the Rwandan genocide as "radically revisionist" if not "fantasist".

== Private life ==
Herman was married to Mary Woody, who died in 2013, for 67 years. He married long-time friend Christine Abbott in 2015.

=== Death ===
Herman died from complications of bladder cancer in Penn Valley, Pennsylvania, on November 11, 2017, at age 92.

== Books ==
- 1966: America's Vietnam Policy: the Strategy of Deception, Public Affairs Press (with Richard Du Boff)
- 1968: Principles And Practices Of Money And Banking
- 1968: The Great Society Dictionary
- 1970: Atrocities in Vietnam: Myths and Realities ISBN 978-0-82980-188-0
- 1973: Counter-Revolutionary Violence: Bloodbaths in Fact & Propaganda (with Noam Chomsky)
- 1979: The Political Economy of Human Rights, Volume I: The Washington Connection and Third World Fascism (with Noam Chomsky)
- 1979: The Political Economy of Human Rights, Volume II: After the Cataclysm: Postwar Indochina and the Reconstruction of Imperial Ideology (with Noam Chomsky)
- 1981: Corporate Control, Corporate Power: A Twentieth Century Fund Study
- 1982: The Real Terror Network: Terrorism in Fact and Propaganda, South End Press
- 1984: Demonstration Elections: U.S.-Staged Elections in the Dominican Republic, Vietnam and El Salvador (with Frank Brodhead) ISBN 978-0-89608-214-4
- 1986: The Rise and Fall of the Bulgarian Connection (with Frank Brodhead). ISBN 0-940380-06-4.
- 1988: Manufacturing Consent: The Political Economy of the Mass Media (with Noam Chomsky)
- 1990: The "Terrorism" Industry: The Experts and Institutions that Shape Our View of Terror ISBN 978-0-679-72559-6
- 1992: Beyond Hypocrisy: Decoding the News in an Age of Propaganda: Including the Doublespeak Dictionary ISBN 0-89608-436-1
- 1995: Triumph of the Market: Essays on Economics, Politics, and the Media ISBN 978-0-896-08521-3
- 1997: The Global Media: The New Missionaries of Global Capitalism (with Robert McChesney) ISBN 0-304-33433-2
- 1999: The Myth of The Liberal Media: An Edward Herman Reader ISBN 978-0-82044-186-3
- 2000: Degraded Capability : the Media and the Kosovo Crisis (edited by Philip Hammond and Edward S. Herman) ISBN 978-0-74531-631-4
- 2010: The Politics of Genocide (with David Peterson) ISBN 978-1-58367-212-9
- 2024: Enduring Lies: The Rwandan Genocide in the Propaganda System, 20 Years Later (with David Paterson) ISBN 978-1-50075-111-1
- 2019: Like A Cuttlefish Spurting Out Ink: Studies in the Art of Deceit (with David Peterson) ISBN 978-1-54566-755-2

== See also ==
- Z Communications
