= Roy H. Park School of Communications =

Private school in Ithaca, New York

Coordinates: 42.42412°N 76.49518°W

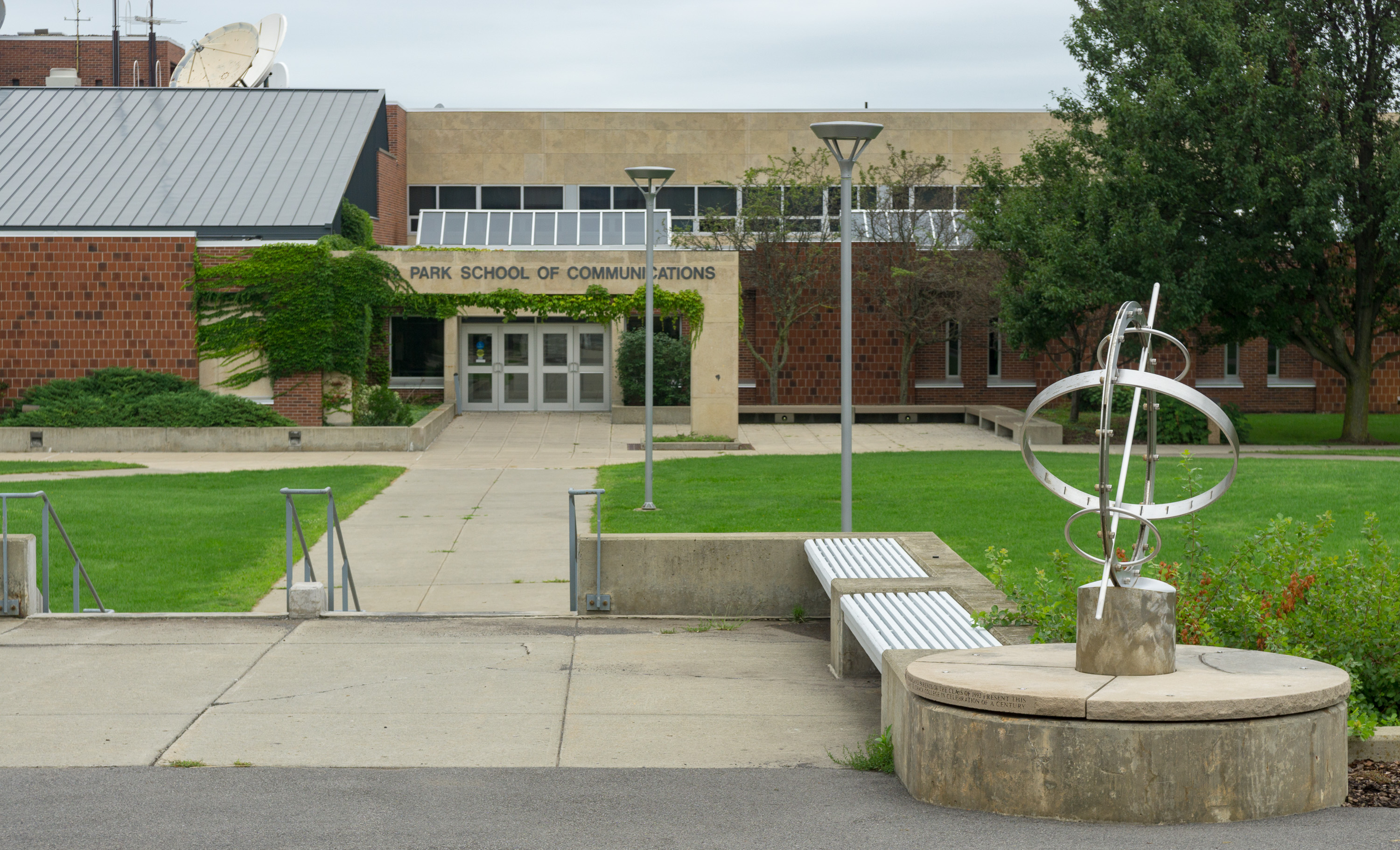
- Type: Private
- Established: 1973 (school founded)
- Parent institution: Ithaca College
- Dean: Jack Powers (interim dean)
- Faculty: 53 (FT)
- Students: 1,630
- Undergraduates: 1,600
- Postgraduates: 30
- Location: Ithaca, New York, United States
- Campus: Small city
- Website: ithaca.edu/roy-h-park-school-communications

The Roy H. Park School of Communications is one of five schools at Ithaca College, in Ithaca, New York, United States. The school is named after media executive Roy H. Park, who lived in Ithaca and who served on the board of trustees at Ithaca College for many years.

In addition to its campus facilities in Ithaca, it runs the Pendleton Center in Los Angeles where students can study and engage in internships for a semester. Students also may study away at the college's center in London and through a newly established New York City program.

Diane Gayeski, an alumna of the school and a faculty member since 1979, served as its dean for more than a decade before retiring in 2020.

== History ==
Ithaca College first began offering courses in radio in the 1930s and a degree program in 1947. With the advent of mass media, the focus began shifting to television and film. The Bachelor of Science in Cinema Studies and Photography was established in the late 1960s. In 1969, the communications programs were formally organized into a division within the college before becoming the present-day School of Communications in the 1973–74 academic year. From 1968 – 1989, the Communications School shared space in Dillingham Center with the Theatre Arts programs and Theatre. It was renamed after Roy H. Park in 1989.

== Academics ==
The Roy H. Park School offers the following academic programs:

=== Undergraduate majors ===
- Advertising, Public Relations, and Marketing Communications (B.S.)
- Documentary Studies and Production (B.A.)
- Film (B.F.A)
- Journalism (B.A.)
- Sports Media (B.S.)
- Television, Photography, and Digital Media (B.S.) with concentrations in Emerging Media, Photography, and Television & Digital Media Production
- Writing for Film, Television, and Emerging Media (B.F.A)
- Park Pathways

=== Undergraduate minors ===
- Advertising, Public Relations, and Marketing Communications
- Animation and VFX
- Audio Production for Film & TV
- International Communications
- Journalism
- Live Event Design and Management
- Still Photography
- Writing for Film, Television, & Emerging Media

== Park Center for Independent Media ==
In 2008, the Park School launched the Park Center for Independent Media, directed by Jeff Cohen, founder of Fairness and Accuracy in Reporting. It has been designated as a national center for the study of media outlets that create and distribute content outside traditional corporate systems and news organizations. Rory Kennedy, documentary filmmaker, was the center's inaugural speaker in January 2008. Kennedy is the co-founder and president of Moxie Firecracker Films, Inc. The Park Center for Independent Media offers the Independent Media Internship Awards, which provides a $2,500 grant to each chosen student who works as a summer intern at specific independent media outlets.

== Annual Izzy Award ==
The school's first annual "Izzy Award" for "special achievement in independent media" was presented on March 31, 2009, to blogger Glenn Greenwald and Democracy Now! host and executive producer Amy Goodman. Roughly 800 people attended the award ceremony at Ithaca’s State Theatre – including I.F. "Izzy" Stone's son Jeremy Stone.

Subsequent winners of the award have included Jeremy Scahill, Naomi Klein, Mother Jones, and the Center for Media and Democracy.

- In 2018, the award was shared by Lee Fang, Sharon Lerner, Dahr Jamail, and Todd Miller.
- In 2019, the award was shared by Laura Flanders, the Earth Island Journal, Aaron Maté, and Dave Lindorff.
- In 2020, the award was shared by Matt Taibbi for Hate Inc, the Puerto Rican organization Centro de Periodismo Investigativo (CPI, the Center for Investigative Journalism) and News Inside.
- In 2021, the award was shared by Liliana Segura and Tim Schwab along with the publication Truthout during the 13th annual Izzy Award ceremony.
- In 2022, the award was shared by Block Club Chicago, Better Government Association, The City, the International Consortium of Investigative Journalists, and indigenous journalist Jenni Monet.
- In 2023, the award was shared by the news outlets The Lever and Mississippi Free Press, and journalists Carlos Ballesteros and Liza Gross.

== Park Scholar Award ==
The Park Scholar Award is a four-year, full scholarship to Ithaca College given each year to a small number of students in the Roy H. Park School of Communications. The award, provided by the Park Foundation, recognizes communications students who excel in academics, leadership, and community service, and intend to use their careers in communications for social good.

== Student media ==
=== The Ithacan ===
The Ithacan is Ithaca College's official newspaper. The paper is written, edited and published by students. The Ithacan is available in print every Thursday morning and online. The Ithacan and its staff have won many major collegiate journalism awards, most notably, the Associated Collegiate Press' National Pacemaker Awards (widely considered the Pulitzer Prize of collegiate journalism) and many New York State Press Association awards.

=== Ithaca College Radio ===
Ithaca College is home to two student-operated radio stations. 92 WICB is an FCC-licensed station that operates at 4100 Watts at 91.7 FM. Programming is also streamed live on its website, through the iHeartRadio app, and WICB's iOS app. The majority of its programming falls under the modern rock category, with a variety of specialty programming also available. While broadcasting modern rock, the station is run similarly to a commercial modern rock station, with the inclusion of playlists planned by the programming and music departments that include leeway for listener requests and DJ choices. The station was honored with the MTVU Woodie Award for Best College Radio Station. They were also named the Top Collegiate Radio Station by The Princeton Review.

== Notable alumni ==
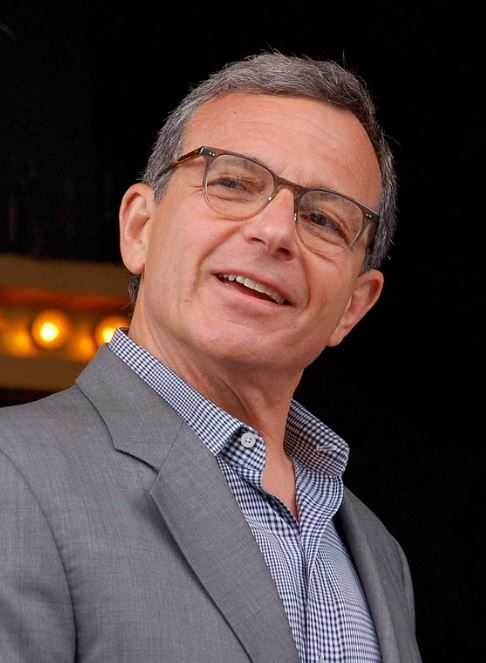
Robert Allen Iger '73, chairman and chief executive officer of The Walt Disney Company

- Robert Allen Iger (B.S. 1974), chairman and CEO, The Walt Disney Company
- Bob Kur, NBC News television journalist
- Jessica Savitch (1947–1983) (B.S. 1968), network news anchor
- David Muir (B.A. 1995), ABC World News anchor and managing editor (September 2014)
- Robin Young, host, National Public Radio, Here and Now
- Karl Ravech (B.S. 1987), ESPN sportscaster
- Mark Romanek, director of One Hour Photo and music videos
- David Boreanaz (B.S. 1991), actor, Buffy the Vampire Slayer, Angel and Bones
- Mark Mahoney (B.S. 1985), Pulitzer Prize winner for Editorial Writing, The Post-Star
- David Guy Levy (B.S. 2001), film producer, Terri, August
- Kevin Connors (B.S. 1997), ESPN sportscaster
- David Brody (B.S.1988), Emmy Award winning journalist
- Brian Herzlinger, film producer, My Date with Drew, special correspondent on The Tonight Show
- Jschlatt, YouTuber, Streamer and director

In 2014, for the 40th anniversary, the Park School created a list of 40 Alumni Who Shape the Communications Industry.

== Notable former and current faculty ==
- Jeff Cohen, founder of Fairness and Accuracy in Reporting
- Cathy Lee Crane, the recipient of the 2013 Guggenheim Fellowship in Film-Video. She had previously received a 2009 New York Foundation for the Arts Artist Fellowship for Film and a grant from the New York State Council on the Arts. Her work has been invited to screen at the National Gallery of Art in 2015 as part of their new series American Originals Now.
- Nicholas Muellner, a photo-based artist, writer, and curator. He teaches photography and critical studies.
- Rod Serling, taught at Ithaca College Communications School 1967–1975; Emmy Award-winning screenwriter; creator and host of The Twilight Zone
