= Ithaca College =

Private college in Ithaca, New York, US

Coordinates: 42.4218°N 76.4947°W

- Former name: Ithaca Conservatory of Music (1892–1931)
- Motto: Commitment to Excellence
- Type: Private college
- Established: September 19, 1892; 134 years ago
- Academic affiliations: NAICU; CIC
- Endowment: $437.1 million (2025)
- President: La Jerne Terry Cornish
- Faculty: 721
- Administrative staff: 987
- Students: 6,266 (Fall 2019)
- Undergraduates: 4,957 (Fall 2020)
- Postgraduates: 414 (Fall 2019)
- Location: Ithaca, New York, U.S.
- Campus: Small city, 757 acres (306 ha)
- Colors: Blue, gold, gray
- Nickname: Bombers
- Sporting affiliations: NCAA Division III – Liberty League, USCSSA
- Website: ithaca.edu

Ithaca College is a private college in Ithaca, New York, United States. Founded in 1892 as a music conservatory, the college has a liberal arts focus, and today confers degrees in over 100 majors. In addition to several pre-professional programs, it offers several graduate programs, mainly in business, health sciences, and teaching degrees through the School of Humanities and Sciences.

Building on its heritage, the school provides media-related and entertainment programs within the Roy H. Park School of Communications and the Ithaca College School of Music, Theatre, and Dance.

== History ==
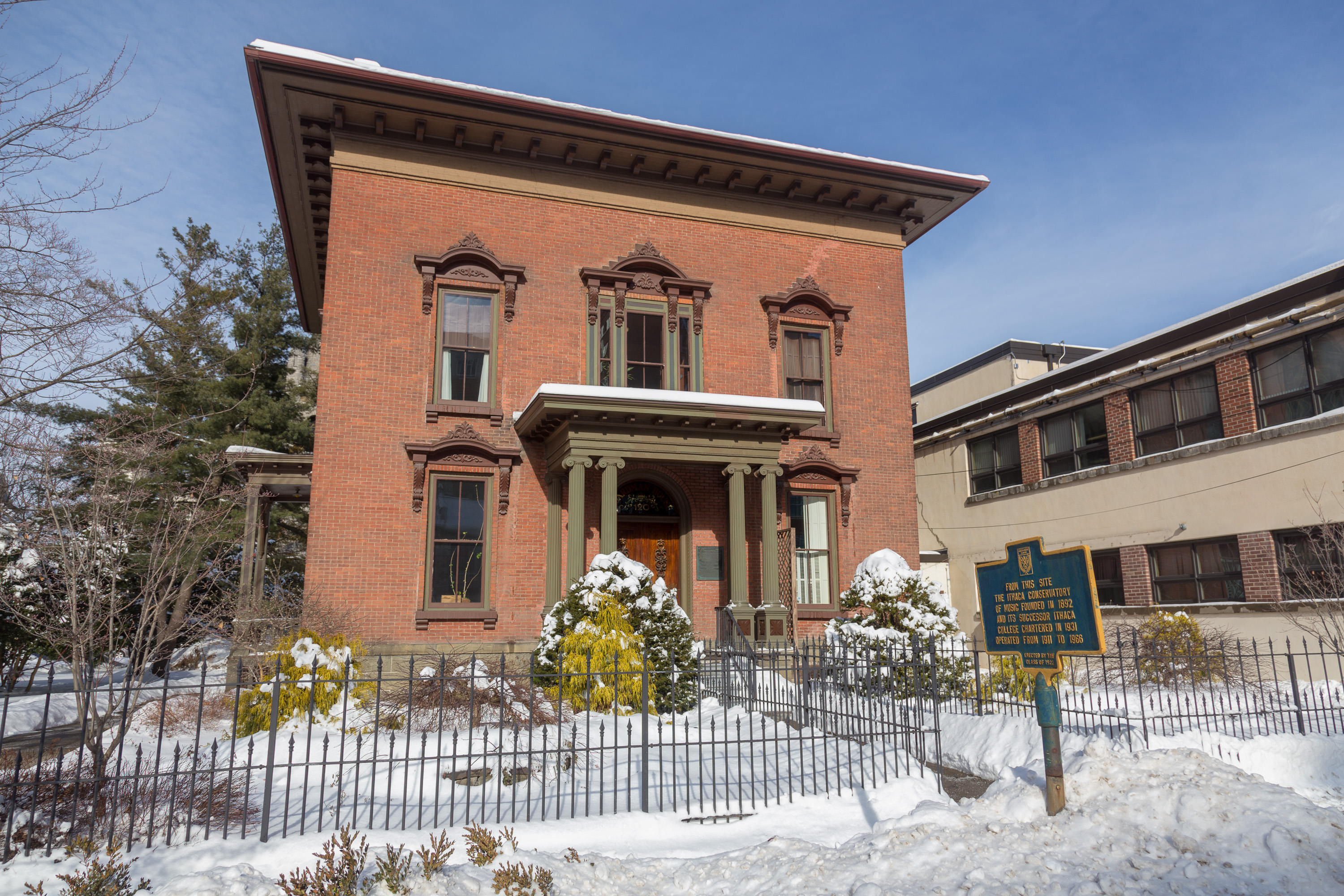
Boardman House, the original site of Ithaca Conservatory of Music

Ithaca College was founded as the Ithaca Conservatory of Music in 1892 by local violin teacher William Grant Egbert. For nearly seven decades the institution grew in the city of Ithaca, adding to its music curriculum the study of elocution, dance, physical education, speech correction, radio, business, and the liberal arts. In 1931 the conservatory was chartered as a private college under its current name, Ithaca College. Music remained a cornerstone of the institution. In 1934, composer Sergei Rachmaninoff joined the Board of Trustees. The college was originally in the Boardman House; that building later became the Ithaca College Museum of Art, and it was listed on the National Register of Historic Places in 1971.

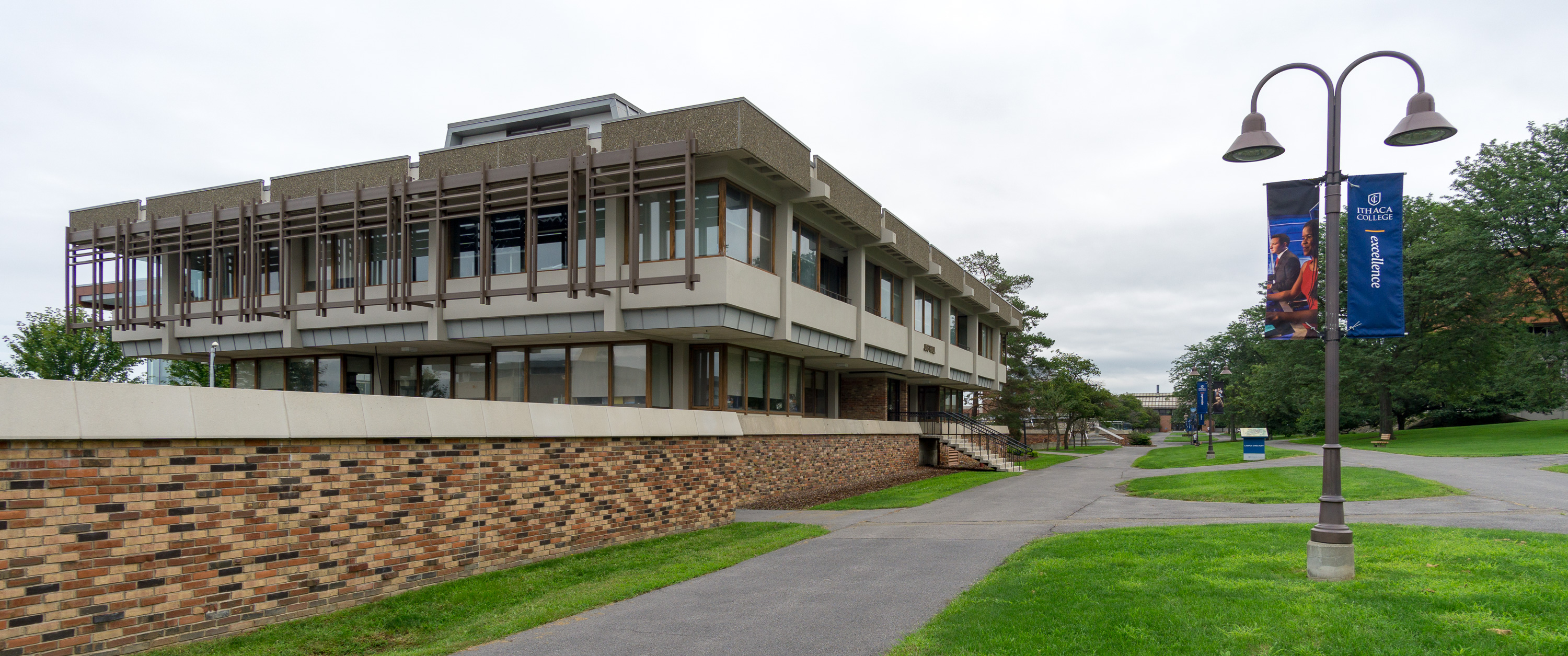
Job Hall

By 1960, the college had some 2,000 students. A campus was built on South Hill in the 1960s, and students were shuttled between the old and new locations during the construction. As of 2009, the student body included representatives from most U.S. states and 78 countries.

In August 2025, it was reported that the college agreed to settle a class action made by a group of former students regarding tuition refunds during the COVID-19 pandemic. As part of the settlement, the college agreed to pay the claimants a total of $1.5 million.

== Organization ==
=== Leadership ===
The college is governed by a board of trustees, composed of 25 non-executive trustees. The board is currently chaired by John Neeson. Presidents of Ithaca College have included:

President	Life	Tenure
1) W. Grant Egbert	1867–1928	1892–1924
2) George C. Williams	1874–1971	1924–1932
3) Leonard B. Job	1891–1981	1932–1957
4) Howard I. Dillingham	1904–1998	1957–1970
5) Ellis L. Phillips Jr.	1926–2006	1970–1975
6) James J. Whalen	1927–2001	1975–1997
7) Peggy R. Williams		1997–2008
8) Thomas Rochon		2008–2017
9) Shirley M. Collado		2017–2021
10) La Jerne Terry Cornish		2021–present

During the fall 2015 semester, multiple protests focusing on campus climate and Thomas Rochon's leadership were led by students and faculty. After multiple racially charged events including student house party themes and racially tinged comments at administration led-programs, students, faculty and staff all decided to hold votes of "no confidence" in Rochon. Students voted "no confidence" by a count of 72 per cent no confidence, 27 per cent confidence, and 1 per cent abstaining. The faculty voted 77.8 per cent no confidence to 22.2 per cent confidence. Rochon retired on July 1, 2017.

Shirely M. Collado was president of Ithaca College from 2017 to 2021 and was the first Dominican American to be named president of a college in the United States. In October 2020, the college announced that 130 of its 547 faculty positions would be cut to reduce the school's budget by $30 million because of declining enrollment. 4,957 undergraduate students enrolled in the fall of 2020, versus 5,852 in 2019 and 6,101 in 2018.

== Campus ==
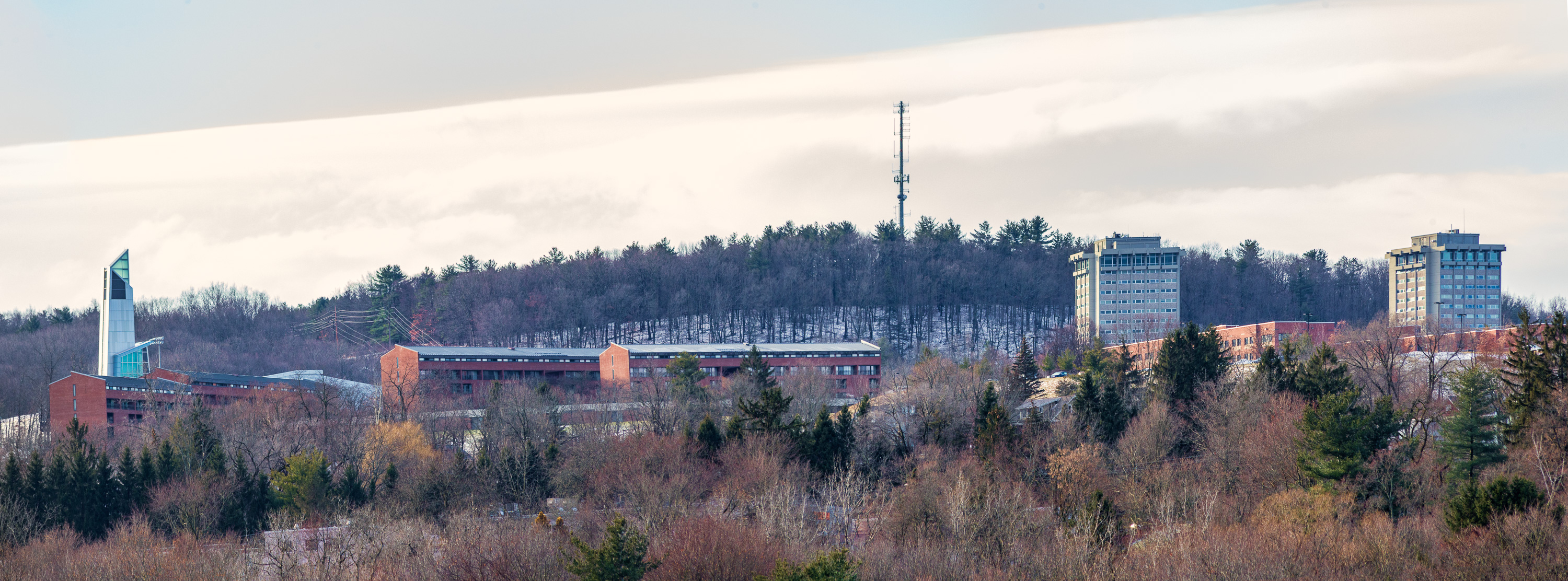
Ithaca College and South Hill, viewed from Eddy Street in 2020

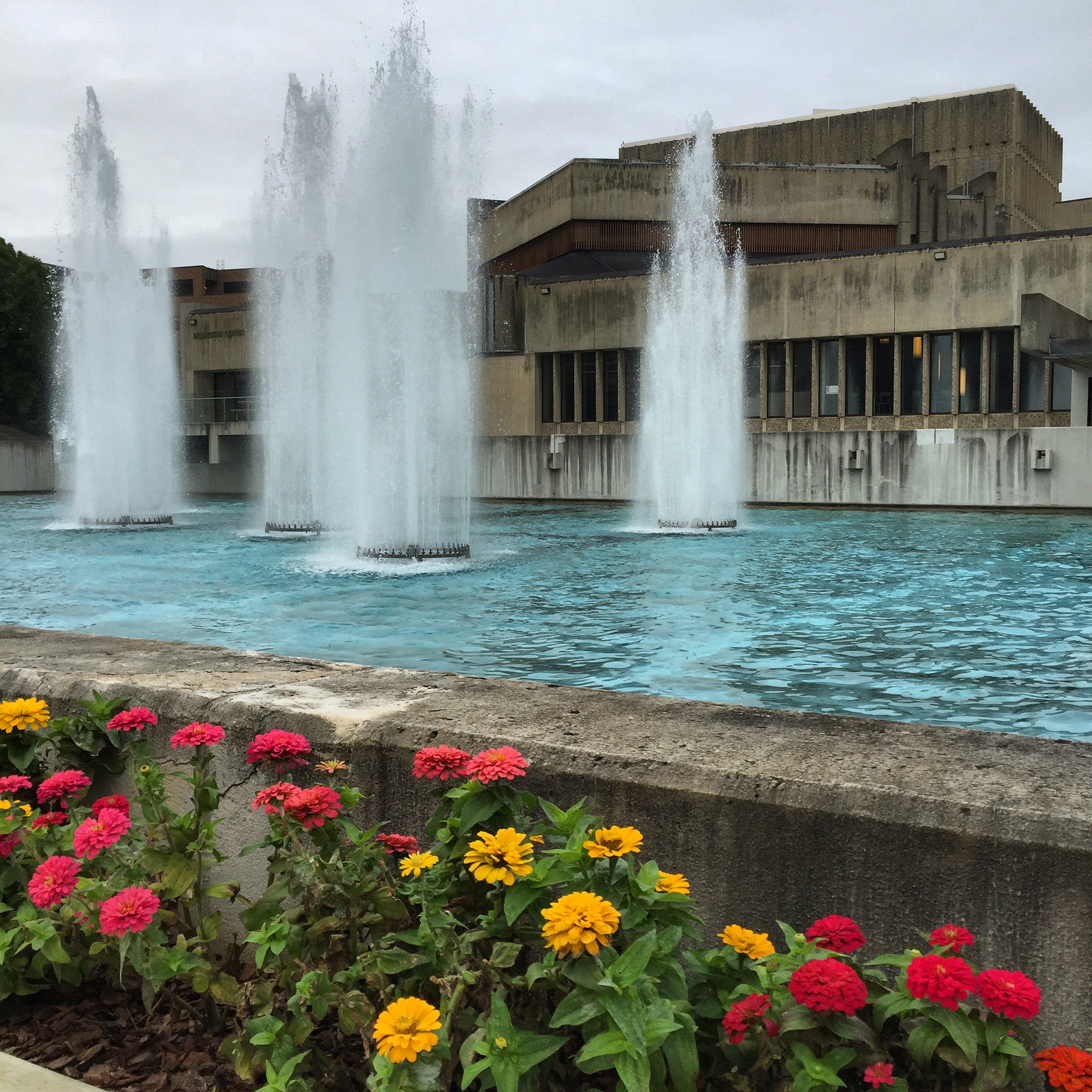
Dillingham Center and its fountains in 2018

Ithaca College's campus was built in the 1960s on South Hill. The college's final academic department moved from downtown to the South Hill campus in 1968, making the move complete. In February 2025, the college announced the development of a new outdoor track facility at the college, due to be completed in spring 2026.

=== Satellite campuses ===
Besides its Ithaca campus, Ithaca College has operated satellite campuses in other cities. The Ithaca College London Center has been in existence since 1972. Ithaca runs the Ithaca College Los Angeles Program at the James B. Pendleton Center. Former programs include the Ithaca College Antigua Program and the Ithaca College Walkabout Down Under Program in Australia.

As of 2009, Ithaca College operated direct enrollment exchange programs with 14 universities, including Griffith University, La Trobe University, Murdoch University, and University of Tasmania (Australia); Chengdu Sport University and Beijing Sport University (China); University of Hong Kong (Hong Kong); Masaryk University (Czech Republic); Akita International University and University of Tsukuba (Japan); Hanyang University (Korea); Nanyang Technological University (Singapore); University of Valencia (Spain); and Jönköping University (Sweden). Ithaca College is also affiliated with study abroad programs such as IES Abroad and offers dozens of exchange or study abroad options to students.

== Academics ==
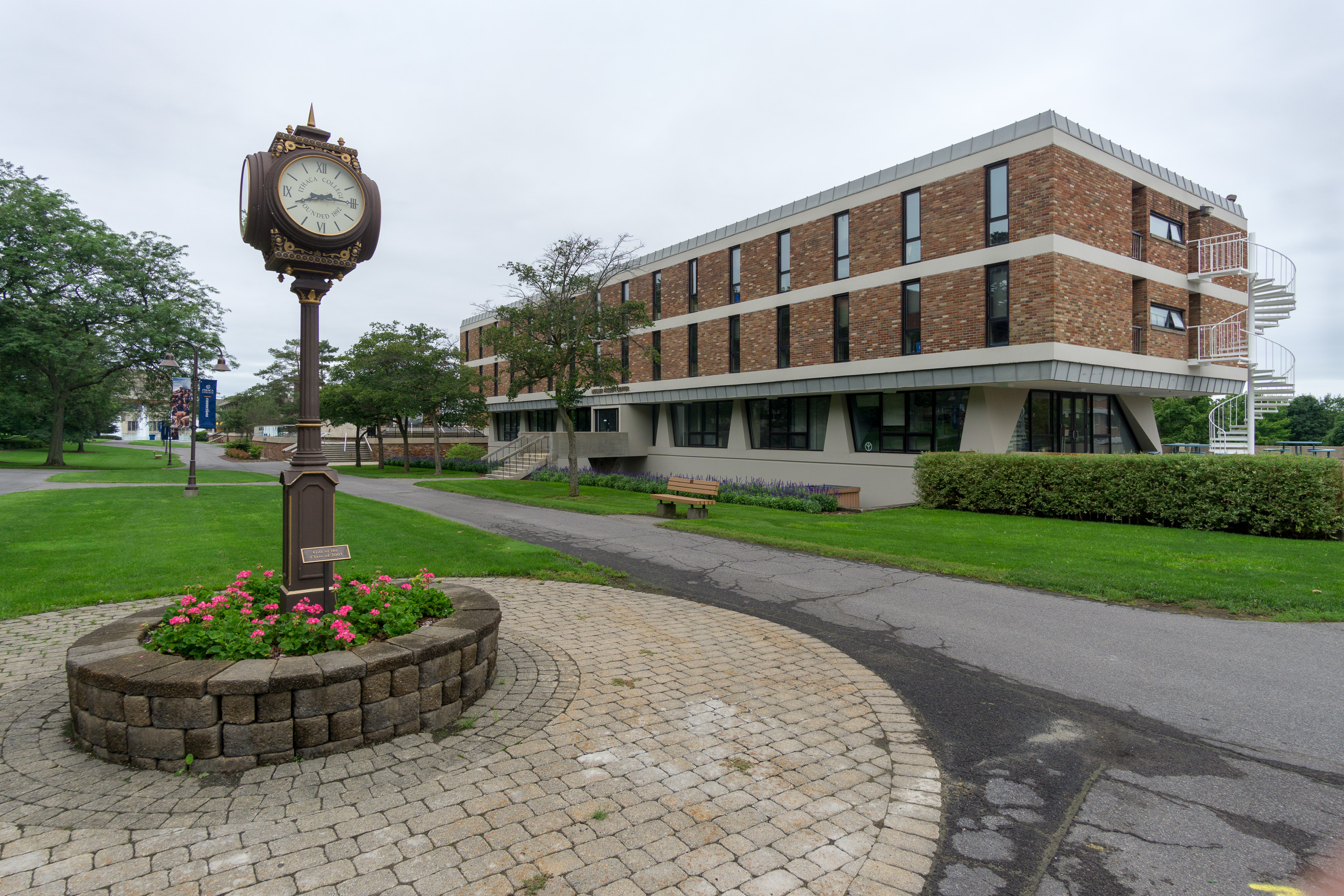
Muller Faculty Center and Class of 2003 clock

Academic rankings

Master's
- Washington Monthly: 111

Regional
- U.S. News & World Report: 11

National
- Forbes: 380
- WSJ/College Pulse: 234

The college offers a curriculum with more than 100 degree programs in its five schools:

- School of Business
- Roy H. Park School of Communications
- School of Health Sciences & Human Performance
- School of Humanities & Sciences
- School of Music, Theatre, and Dance

Until the spring of 2011, several cross-disciplinary degree programs, along with the Center for the Study of Culture, Race, and Ethnicity, were housed in the Division of Interdisciplinary and International Studies; in 2011, the division was eliminated and its programs, centers, and institutes were absorbed into other schools.

As of 2017, the most popular majors included visual and performing arts, health professions and related programs, business, management, marketing, and related support services and biological and biomedical sciences.

== Student life ==
=== Media and publications ===
- The Ithacan is Ithaca College's official weekly newspaper that is written, edited and published by students. Most notably, the newspaper is a consistent recipient of the Associated Collegiate Press' National Pacemaker Award; it has received the National Newspaper Pacemaker Award six times and the Online Pacemaker Award nine times (both most recently in 2015). The Ithacan is also a five-time recipient of the Gold Crown Award from the Columbia Scholastic Press Association, most recently receiving the award in 2016. The Ithacan was also ranked #3 on the 2018 The Princeton Review Best College Newspaper list.
- Ithaca College Television (ICTV), founded in 1958, describes itself as one of the oldest student-operated college television channels. The channel is available to 26,000 cable households. It has received awards for its programming, including recognition from the New York State Associated Press Broadcasters Association and the Society of Professional Journalists. The show also received ICTV's first College Emmy Award from the Academy of Television Arts & Sciences. ICTV is housed and operated in the Roy H. Park School of Communications. Approximately 15 to 20 production teams operate simultaneously, utilizing around 400 volunteers each semester. Programming varies by semester, but typically includes news, sports, entertainment, scripted, and podcast programs.
- WICB is a student-operated, 4,100 watt FM station that serves Tompkins County and beyond, reaching from northern Pennsylvania to Lake Ontario, with a potential audience of over 250,000. The majority of programming on WICB – which broadcasts from 91.7 on the FM band – is modern rock, but the station also airs a number of specialty shows, which includes a number of genres (including blues, Broadway, jam band music and "homeless" music) that is not normally heard on public airwaves. Readers of the Ithaca Times voted 92 WICB "Best Radio Station." WICB has won MTV U's Woodie Award for Best College Radio and has been ranked by The Princeton Review as a top college radio station.
- VIC Radio is Ithaca College's second student-run radio station. Previously available on 105.9 FM, VIC Radio is now an online-only radio station. It is most well known for its annual 50 Hour Marathon, in which four DJs broadcast for 50 hours straight to raise money for local community organizations.
- Buzzsaw Magazine, formerly Buzzsaw Haircut, was founded in 1999 and is an independent monthly alternative magazine written, produced and distributed by Ithaca College students. It is a progressive publication with a goal to "publish original creative journalism, commentary and satire that works to deconstruct society, pop culture, politics, college life and dominant Western beliefs." The faculty adviser is media critic Jeff Cohen, who is also the founder of the college's Park Center for Independent Media. In 2011, the organization added a new multimedia section to Buzzsaw, titled Seesaw, dedicated to creating documentaries, radio pieces, interactive graphics, and other multimedia pieces to complement the print and online magazine. Buzzsaw has also won a number of national awards, including the Campus Alternative Journalism Project's award for "Best Sense of Humor" and the Independent Press Association's Campus Independent Journalism Awards for "Best Campus Publication with a Budget Under $10,000" and "Best Political Commentary."
- Park Productions partners with community organizations, government agencies, and higher education institutions and has produced over 200 titles including documentaries, feature films, shorts, commercials, museum exhibits, television programs, educational, corporate, and web-based media. Awards and juried screenings include LA Webfest, Mexico International Film Festival, CINE Awards, Chicago International Film Festival, Official selections at Miami, University Film and Video Festival, Cinema in Industry Awards, Multiple International Communicator Awards, Oberhausen, Montreal, Palm Springs, and Hudson Valley Film Festivals.
- Distinct Magazine is a student publication focused on fashion and campus culture. The first issue was released online in 2016.
- Embrace is a student magazine focused on representation and issues affecting underrepresented students. The magazine has separate content sections: LGBTQ+, Fashion, Politics and News, Mind Body Spirit, Personal Narratives, and Alumni Highlight. It was first published in February 2016.

=== Greek life ===
Historically, various independent and national fraternities and sororities had active chapters at Ithaca College. However, due to a series of highly publicized hazing incidents in the 1980s, including one which was responsible for the death of a student, the college administration reevaluated their Greek life policy and only professional music fraternities were allowed to remain affiliated with the school.

As of 2024, professional coed music fraternity Mu Phi Epsilon is the only remaining recognized Greek organization on campus. Previously, three other recognized music and performing arts houses also existed on campus:

- Phi Mu Alpha Sinfonia (Delta Chapter) - became inactive in 2024
- Sigma Alpha Iota (Epsilon Chapter) - became inactive in 2024
- Kappa Gamma Psi (Iota Chapter) - became inactive in 2008

There are various Greek letter organizations at Ithaca College that are unaffiliated with the school, and not subject to the same housing privileges or rules that contribute to the safety of their members such as non-hazing and non-drinking policies. Additionally, while not particularly common, Ithaca College students may rush for Greek houses affiliated with nearby Ivy institution Cornell University, subject to the rules of each individual fraternity or sorority. Some Cornell-affiliated Greek organizations actively recruit Ithaca College students.

There are a few unaffiliated fraternities which some Ithaca College students may join, ΔΚΕ (Delta Kappa Epsilon), ΑΕΠ (Alpha Epsilon Pi), ΦΚΣ (Phi Kappa Sigma), ΦΙΑ (Phi Iota Alpha), ΛΥΛ (Lambda Upsilon Lambda), and ΚΣ (Kappa Sigma). There are unaffiliated sororities including ΓΔΠ (Gamma Delta Pi), ΠΛΧ (Pi Lambda Chi), ΦΜΖ (Phi Mu Zeta), .

=== Music ===
Ithaca College has a successful music school, and offers opportunities to perform music, such as ensembles within the official School of Music, Theatre, and Dance or student-organized organizations dedicated to performing music outside of the official School of Music.

The School of Music offers many audition-based ensembles including symphony orchestra, chamber orchestra, wind ensemble, concert band, multiple choir ensembles, multiple jazz ensembles ranging from instrumental to vocal, as well as several other chamber groups focusing on a multitude of instruments. It also offers multiple opportunities to perform opera works like the school's Opera Workshop, which offers a variety of focused training in such areas as audition technique, interpretation, and scene study through multiple performance opportunities. The school offers several non-auditioned ensembles, such as the symphony orchestra Sinfonietta. Additionally, several non-auditioned ensembles for band, jazz, and choir opened up to non-music majors. The School of Music, Theatre, and Dance showcases multiple audition-based productions a year, typically featuring multiple musical theater productions and an opera.

Outside of the School of Music, Theatre, and Dance, there are several student-run a cappella groups on campus including:

- IC Voicestream, founded in 2002, is the college's premier all-gender inclusive a cappella group.
- Ithacappella, founded in 1996, is the college's only all-male identifying a cappella group.
- Premium Blend, the college's only all-female aligned a cappella group
- Tone Cold, an all gender inclusive a cappella group
- Pitch Please, the college's only non-auditioned all-gender a cappella group
- NUVO (New Voices), founded in 2024, is the college's BIPOC inclusive a cappella group.

== Athletics ==
Ithaca competes in athletics at the NCAA Division III level as a members of the Liberty League and the Eastern College Athletic Conference (ECAC). The Bombers have won 14 national titles in seven team sports and five individual sports. Ithaca was a member of the Empire 8 prior to being in Division III. Athletics have long been a cornerstone of the college. In 1935, acclaimed sportswriter Grantland Rice joined the board of trustees.

== Intramurals ==
Along with Intercollegiate athletics, Ithaca College has a large intramural sport program. The extracurricular program serves approximately 25% of the undergraduate population yearly. Among the 14 traditional team activities offered throughout the year are basketball, flag football, kickball, soccer, softball, ultimate (ultimate frisbee), ski racing, and volleyball.

For most activities there are divisions with men's, women's, and co-recreational teams.

== Sustainability ==
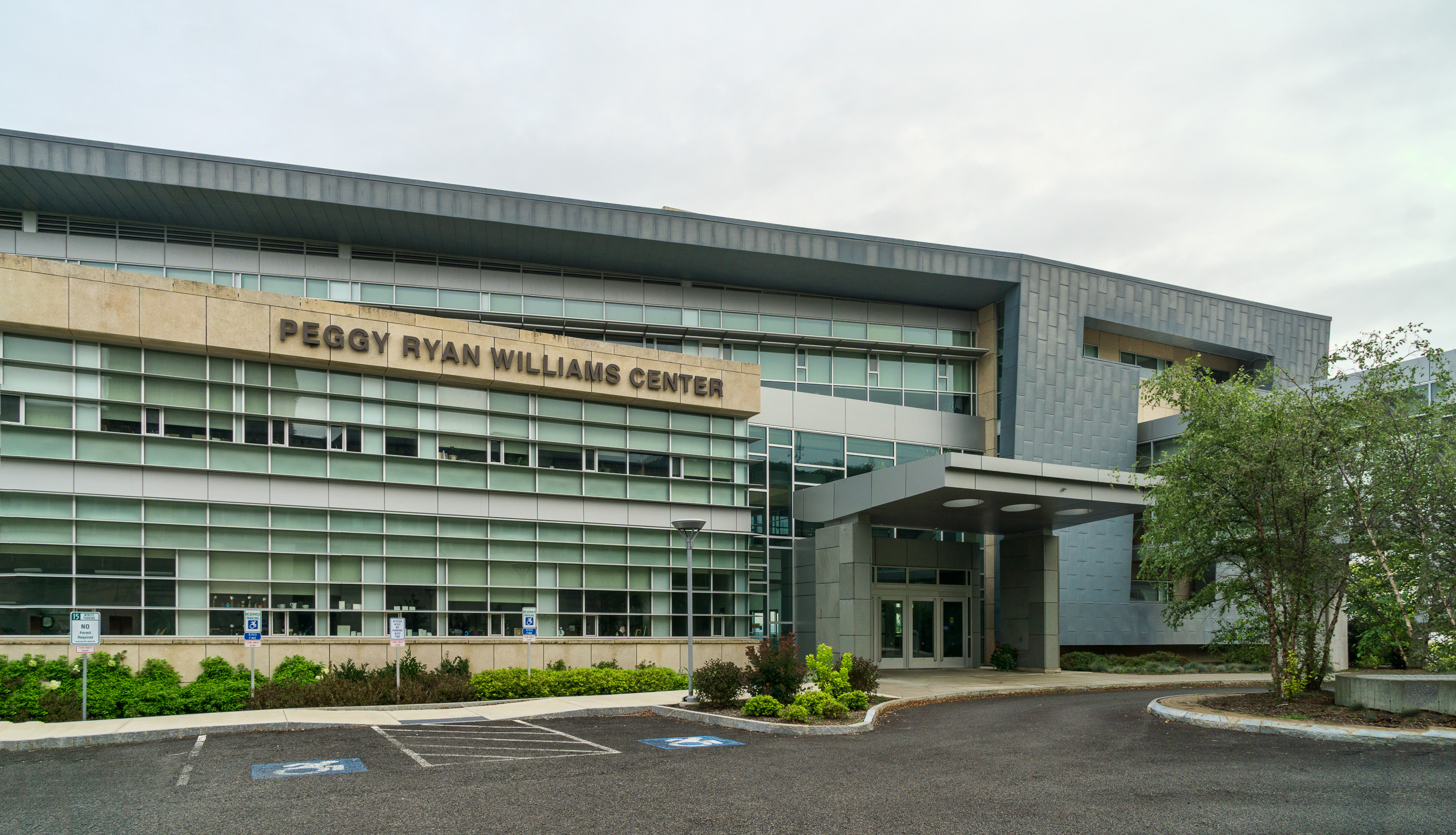
The Peggy Ryan Williams Center is LEED Platinum Certified.

Ithaca's School of Business was the first college or university business school in the world to achieve LEED Platinum Certification. Ithaca's Peggy Ryan Williams Center is also LEED Platinum certified. The college also has a LEED Gold Certified building, the Athletics & Events Center. The college composts its dining hall waste, runs a "Take It or Leave It" Green move-out program, and offers a sustainable living option. It operates an office supply collection and reuse program, as well as a sustainability education program during new student orientation. Ithaca College received a B− grade on the Sustainable Endowments Institute's 2009 College Sustainability Report Card and an A− for 2010.

In 2017, Ithaca College was listed as one of Princeton Review's top "green colleges" for being environmentally responsible.

=== Commitments to action on climate change ===
In the spring of 2007, President Peggy R. Williams signed the American College & University President's Climate Commitment (ACUPCC), pledging Ithaca College to achieve "carbon neutrality". In 2009, the Board of Trustees approved the Ithaca College Climate Action Plan, which called for 100% carbon neutrality by 2050. It also offered a 40-year action plan.

=== Energy profile ===
The college purchases 100 percent of its electricity from renewable sources. Including solar offsets, the college reports its overall energy usage as 45% carbon neutral.

=== Energy investments ===
The college aims to optimize investment returns and does not invest the endowment in on-campus sustainability projects, renewable energy funds, or community development loan funds. The college's investment policy reserves the right of the investment committee to restrict investments for any reason, which could include environmental and sustainability factors.

== Notable alumni ==
Ithaca College has over 70,000 alumni, with clubs in Boston, Chicago, Connecticut, Los Angeles, Metro New York, Washington D.C., North and South Carolina, Philadelphia; Rochester, New York; San Diego, and Southern Florida. Alumni events are hosted in cooperation with city-specific clubs and through a program called "IC on the Road".

== Notable faculty ==
Notable current and former Ithaca College faculty include:

- Asma Barlas, politics, director of the Center for the Study of Culture, Race, and Ethnicity. Specializes in comparative and international politics; women, gender, and Islam; Islam and Qur'anic hermeneutics
- Rick Beato, music educator and producer
- Jeff Cohen, journalism, and founding director, Park Center for Independent Media; media critic and commentator, author, founder of Fairness & Accuracy in Reporting (FAIR) media watchdog group
- Patrick Conway, early 20th-century bandleader
- Cathy Lee Crane, filmmaker
- Andrew Ezergailis, history; expert in 20th-century history of Latvia
- Sean Fennessey, journalist, commentator and podcast host
- Robert (Bob) Allen Iger, media business executive who serves as the chief executive officer (CEO) of The Walt Disney Company
- Karel Husa, composer and winner of the 1969 Pulitzer Prize for Music
- A. Van Jordan, poet
- Marisa Kelly, political scientist, president of Suffolk University in Boston
- Keith Moliné, musician, London Center
- Nicholas Muellner, media arts, sciences and studies; photographer and writer whose work has been acclaimed by Time and the Paris Photo–Aperture Foundation
- Alex Perialas, sound recording technology; acclaimed audio engineer and record producer known for his extensive work during the "golden age" of thrash metal
- S. Alexander Reed, music; scholar and maker of electronic and industrial music
- Nick Sagan, novelist and screenwriter
- Rod Serling, communications; creator, producer, and host of The Twilight Zone
- Saviana Stănescu, Romanian American theater; poet, playwright, script analyst, journalist
- Gordon Stout, music; percussionist, composer, specializes in playing the marimba
- Fred A. Wilcox, writing; nonfiction writer, fiction writer, expert on Vietnam War and effects of U.S. use of Agent Orange on U.S. military members and Vietnamese people (retired 2014)
- Dana Wilson, the Charles A. Dana Professor of Music; composer, jazz pianist
