= David Sirota =

American liberal journalist and editor

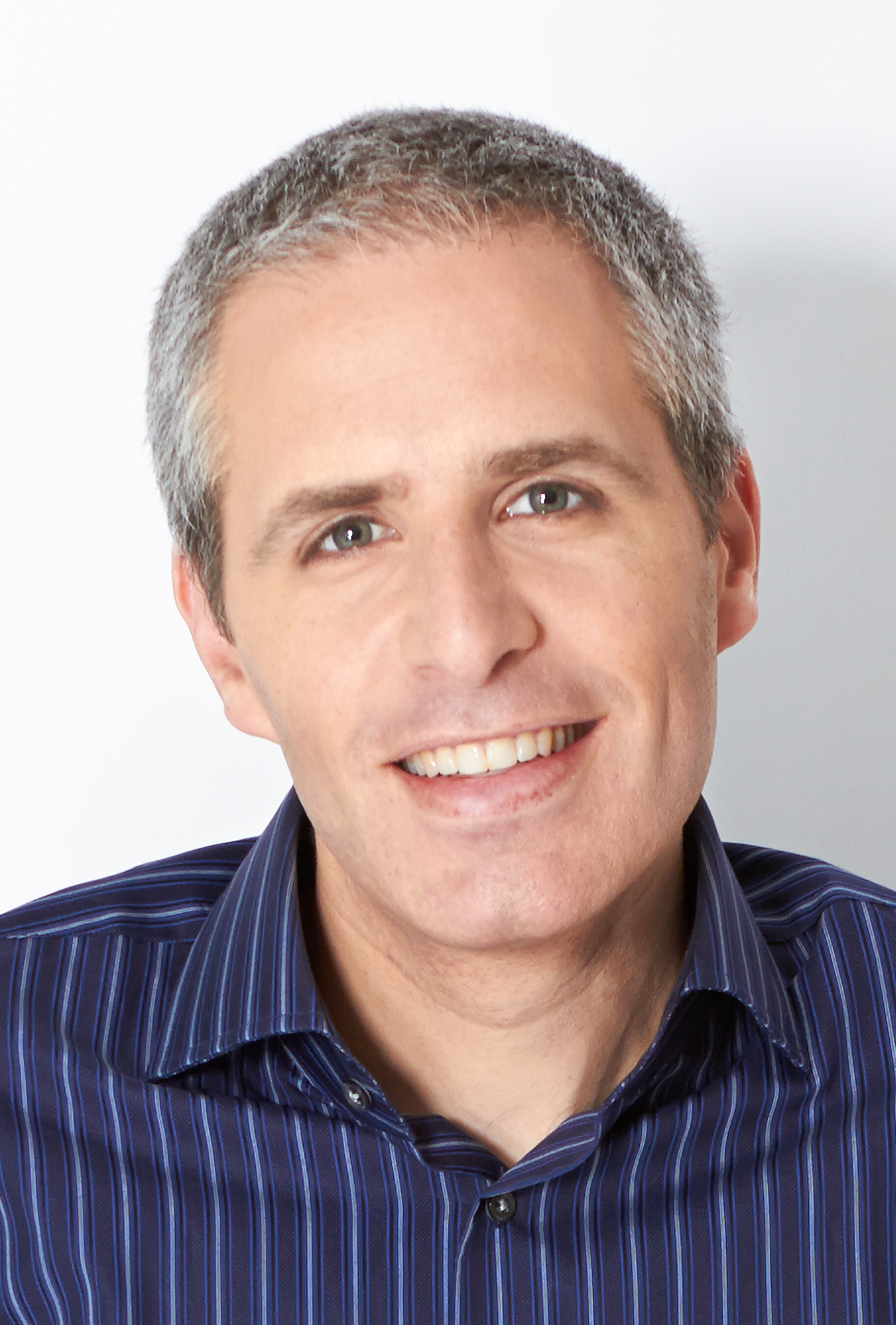
- Sirota in 2011
- Born: November 2, 1975 (age 51); New Haven, Connecticut, U.S.
- Education: Northwestern University (BA)
- Organization: The Lever
- Political party: Independent
- Spouse: Emily Sirota

David J. Sirota (born November 2, 1975) is an American journalist and political commentator, who is the founder and editor-in-chief of The Lever, a reader-supported investigative news outlet focused on exposing the negative influence of corporate corruption on American society. Sirota was a speechwriter and senior adviser for the Bernie Sanders 2020 presidential campaign. In 2022, he received an Academy Award nomination for Best Original Screenplay for conceiving the story for Netflix's Don't Look Up alongside co-writer and director Adam McKay.

Sirota's professional career has spanned politics, media, and journalism. In politics, he has held roles such as campaign manager, fundraiser, spokesperson, strategist, and consultant for a variety of left-leaning Democratic candidates and office holders. He twice worked for Bernie Sanders, both when Sanders was a member of the U. S. House of Representatives and as part of Sanders 2020 presidential campaign. He was also a staff member of the Center for American Progress, a liberal research and advocacy group.

Sirota has also been a columnist for Guardian US, editor-at-large for American left publication Jacobin and senior investigations editor for The International Business Times. He has also worked as television writer and radio host. He has written four books: Hostile Takeover (2006), an exploration of corruption in the U.S. political system; The Uprising (2008), about ordinary citizens frustrations with the U.S. government; Back to Our Future (2011), which explores how the politics and culture of the 1980s influenced the thinking of later generations; and Master Plan: The Hidden Plot To Legalize Corruption In America (2025), co-authored with Jared Jacang Maher.

In his political career, Sirota has been described by his critics as "an attack dog", and by his allies as "intense, driven, even obsessive", and someone with an "eye for critique and the instinct for the jugular [of his political opponents]." In 2003, journalist Richard Wolffe described Sirota as "a man on a mission." In 2023, reflecting on Sirota's varied career, CNN media analyst Brian Stelter wrote, "Sirota's life has been one long campaign against plutocrats and the corrupt politicians who enable them."

== Early life and education ==
Sirota is a native of Abington Township, Pennsylvania, a suburb of Philadelphia. He is the eldest son of Rob Sirota, a retired physician, and Karen Sirota, the former president of a local synagogue. He has two younger brothers. He has described himself as "growing up as a relatively observant Reformed Jew in a Jewish community." Sirota has also described himself as an "intense" fan of the Philadelphia 76ers basketball team while growing up, particularly of the players Charles Barkley and Rick Mahorn. Sirota was able to meet Barkley in 1986 and have his picture taken with him. Sirota was also a fan of the local Philadelphia news station WPVI-TV (also known as 6abc). When Sirota was in the 8th grade, he shadowed local sportscaster Gary Papa for a day. He described his love of the local news station "as part of my journey into journalism".

Sirota met the future actor Bradley Cooper, who lived in the neighboring town of Jenkintown, when they both played on the 1985 East Abington Little League Baseball team. Sirota attended the William Penn Charter School in Philadelphia, where he was close friends with Adam F. Goldberg, who went on to create the TV series The Goldbergs. Goldberg's series, about his life growing up in the suburbs of Philadelphia, featured a recurring character based on Sirota in multiple episodes of the series. The character was also named David Sirota. Sirota attended the Medill School of Journalism at Northwestern University from 1994 to 1998, where he earned a bachelor's degree in journalism and political science. While there, he worked as a reporter for the Daily Northwestern. He also worked on his first political race during his senior year.

== Career ==
=== Political career, 1998–2008 ===
Sirota's career in political campaigns began when he was a research director for Illinois State Senator Howard W. Carroll's unsuccessful run for U.S. representative in Illinois's 9th congressional district in the 1998 election; Carroll lost in the Democratic primary to Illinois State Representative Jan Schakowsky. In 1999, Sirota served as Dwight Evans's deputy mayoral campaign manager in Philadelphia. He was let go for "overzealous behavior" related to the creation of a fake website containing damaging racial comments attributed to Evans' opponent John White Jr. Evans said he believed that Sirota had not created the bogus page, but had discussed it with the person who created it, who was his friend and former college classmate at Northwestern. Sirota then became a fundraiser for Joe Hoeffel in his first successful campaign for the House of Representatives in Pennsylvania's 13th congressional district.

From 1999 to 2001, Sirota worked as press aide and spokesperson for Bernie Sanders, who was then serving as the U.S. representative from Vermont. Sirota has stated that working for Sanders was "completely transformative for me as a person". Sirota also said: "When I first worked for him, I was right out of college. It helped me find who I was and what my values are." According to journalist Brian Stelter, "[Sirota] experienced Congress in all its possibility and all its vulgarity through the eyes of the only registered independent in the institution." From 2001 to 2003, Sirota worked as the communications director for the Democrats on the House Appropriations Committee. He managed press and message development on health care, education, defense, the environment and post-9/11 national security issues.

From 2003 to 2005, Sirota worked at the Center for American Progress (CAP), a liberal research and advocacy group, where he was responsible for rapid response and media outreach. Sirota was hired for the job by former Clinton White House chief of staff John Podesta. According to journalist Richard Wolffe, Podesta said of Sirota: "I didn't know him. I just saw he had an eye for critique and the instinct for the jugular." Wolffe wrote a profile of Sirota in Newsweek in Oct 2003, in which he described Sirota as "the Internet child of the Clinton war room generation." Wolffe also described Sirota as a "political operative" skilled at "hacking out a daily barrage of anti-Bush media clips, commentary, and snappy quotes" who made "guerrilla attacks on the Bush administration", and who was "well schooled in the art of Washington warfare." According to the article, Sirota's main weapons were computer emails. For example, Sirota unearthed a two-year-old comment that Colin Powell had made to the effect that "Iraq posed no threat to its neighbors, and possessed no 'significant capability' in weapons of mass destruction." Sirota made Powell's statements more widely known. Reporters pounced, and it became a public relations blow to the Bush administration. Sirota was credited with having revealed that $87 billion for Iraq could have been used to erase huge state deficits at home, a fact that was repeated by Democrats nationwide. Sirota also created the CAP publication Progress Report.

Sirota served as a senior strategist for Brian Schweitzer's unsuccessful 2000 Senate campaign and successful 2004 gubernatorial campaign. In September 2006, Sirota worked as a political consultant for Ned Lamont's U.S. Senate campaign. Lamont defeated Joe Lieberman in the primary, but Lieberman ran as an independent and defeated Lamont in the November election. In 2008, Sirota was co-chair of the Progressive Legislative Action Network (now renamed the Progressive States Network). He was a senior fellow at the Campaign for America's Future.

=== Journalism and media career, 2005–2019 ===
In May 2005, while writing his own blog, Sirota became a contributor to The Huffington Post. He was a regular guest on The Al Franken Show and makes guest appearances on The Colbert Report, Countdown with Keith Olbermann, NOW, Lou Dobbs Tonight, CNBC, and NPR. He is a senior editor at In These Times, a regular columnist for The Nation and the Intermountain Jewish News, and a past contributor to The American Prospect. He has been published in The Washington Post, the Los Angeles Times, The Baltimore Sun, and the San Francisco Chronicle. Sirota was a contributor to OpenLeft, a now-defunct progressive political blog. In June 2007, he replaced the late progressive columnist Molly Ivins with a column to be syndicated nationally by Creators Syndicate. Sirota became a contributing writer for Salon in May 2011.

From 2009 to 2012, Sirota was the morning host at the Denver progressive talk station KKZN. Sirota was initially filling in for Jay Marvin on his eponymous program; but Marvin was ultimately unable to return, and Sirota became the permanent host in 2010. Sirota also guest hosted for Thom Hartmann and Norman Goldman. On July 16, 2012, Sirota moved to sister station KHOW to co-host an afternoon drive program with former George W. Bush administration FEMA director Michael D. Brown, The Rundown with Sirota and Brown. In January 2013, after nearly four years in radio, Sirota parted ways with KHOW/Clear Channel. Insiders speculate the reason for the abrupt departure was friction between the two co-hosts; it left Brown with his own show. In March 2017, Sirota joined The Young Turks online broadcast network as a contributor, providing periodic investigative reports. In early 2018, after four years of reporting for the International Business Times as senior editor of investigations, Sirota left that publication.

=== Sanders campaign 2019–2020 ===
On March 19, 2019, the Bernie Sanders 2020 presidential campaign announced it had hired Sirota to work as a senior advisor and speechwriter. Sirota joined the Sanders campaign after fourteen years working as a journalist. He stated that he was "happy" working as a journalist, and that journalism is "extremely important." But he accepted the job on the campaign because "I think the crises we're facing now are so enormously existential that when I was asked to serve in this role, I felt I had an obligation and a responsibility to serve. That's why I'm doing it." In describing his role as a speechwriter for Sanders, Sirota stated, "But even though the position is called 'speechwriter,' nobody puts words in Bernie Sanders's mouth. He knows exactly what he wants to say and exactly how he wants to say it. So I'll be supporting him in doing these speeches in the sense of everything from research to data to incorporating examples and stories about what he's saying."

In addition to speech writing, Sirota helped to "plan campaign strategy" and functioned "as a rapid-response war room." Sirota also published the email newsletter Bern Notice and the podcast Hear the Bern. The newsletter and podcast were ways "through which the campaign has tried to bypass traditional news outlets and reach voters directly." The Sanders campaign was notable for its criticism of the mainstream media outlets and their coverage of the issues surrounding the campaign. Writing in the New York Times, journalist Marc Tracy stated:

Mr. Sirota ... has amplified the campaign's consistent focus on criticizing news outlets that most regard as mainstream, targeting stories that he considers unfair.

As an example of the campaign's media criticism, Tracy cited an instance of the campaign's newsletter ("Bern Notice"):

When the first in-house newsletter of Bernie Sanders's campaign landed in inboxes last August, its chief antagonist was neither President Trump nor a rival for the Democratic presidential nomination, but rather The Washington Post and, as the email said, "the Washington pundits who are paid by the corporations and billionaires who own the media."

Campaigning in Iowa a few days earlier, Mr. Sanders, the senator from Vermont, had accused The Post of withholding positive coverage because of his efforts to raise the minimum wage at Amazon, the internet retail giant founded by the newspaper's owner, Jeff Bezos. Several prominent journalists objected to the comment—a "full freak out," as the newsletter, which is called Bern Notice, put it.

"Reporters don't have to receive a call from Jeff Bezos," [the newsletter] said, "to know that their paychecks are signed by a billionaire with a well-known personal and corporate agenda—and knowing that agenda exists can shape overall frameworks and angles of coverage."

Soon after Sirota joined the Sanders campaign, the journalist Edward-Isaac Dovere published an article in The Atlantic accusing Sirota of secretly working on behalf of the Sanders campaign while he was still working as a journalist for The Guardian and Capital & Main. Sirota, The Guardian, and the Sanders campaign refuted these accusations; the editors of Capital & Main declined to comment on the accuracy of the story. Dovere's accusations were also refuted by other investigative journalists. According to journalist Walker Bragman, "[Dovere's] story hinged on an unverifiable quote which the speaker claims was misrepresented, along with innuendo stemming from the fact that Sirota deleted thousands of tweets following his employment. Paste spoke to multiple campaign insiders familiar with the matter, all of whom disputed Dovere's timeline and narrative. Their accounts lined up with what we found through our own reporting on unrelated matters over the last few months. Other individuals have also come forward to publicly refute the article’s claims." Journalist Glenn Greenwald wrote, "Most critically, the key claim that made the article such a sensation – that Sirota's 'informal work for Sanders goes back months' and included 'quietly writing speeches' for the Senator – is entirely and demonstrably false." Sanders suspended his presidential campaign on April 8, 2020. He endorsed Joe Biden on April 13.

=== Jacobin ===
In May 2020, Sirota joined Jacobin as editor-at-large.

=== The Lever ===
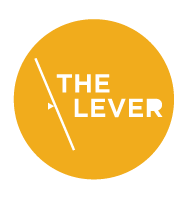

In April 2020, Sirota launched an independent news outlet, The Daily Poster. In May 2021, The Daily Poster moved from Substack to an independent website. In March, 2022, the site was expanded and renamed as The Lever, running on Ghost. The name The Lever is inspired by a quote from the Greek mathematician Archimedes, who said, "Give me a lever long enough and a fulcrum on which to place it, and I shall move the world." Former CNN host Brian Stelter described The Lever as a "small but mighty news start-up."

As of April 2024, The Lever has more than 112,000 active free and paying subscribers, and a staff of nineteen. The Lever's mission, according to Sirota, is to "hold power accountable." According to Managing Editor Joel Warner, The Lever's "bread and butter" reporting and "core area of success" is reporting on "how corporate power is making everything worse for the rest of us".

The investigative reporting from The Lever is frequently cited by other news outlets, including citations in The New York Times, NPR, The Washington Post, Politico, Al Jazeera, Rolling Stone, and The Baltimore Sun. The Lever's reporting has also been cited in tweets and press releases by politicians such as Senator Sheldon Whitehouse, Congressman Ro Khanna, and Congressman Chris Deluzio.

=== Don't Look Up ===
In 2022, Sirota received an Academy Award nomination for Best Original Screenplay for conceiving the story for Netflix's Don't Look Up alongside co-writer and director Adam McKay. The film "tells the story of how an asteroid hurtling toward Earth is ignored by politicians and society in favor of profit and campaigning." According to McKay, his friend Sirota gave him the idea for the film: "'David made a comment about how [the climate crisis was like] an asteroid [about] to hit the planet and no one cares—and it was perfect,' McKay explained. 'I liked it because it could be funny too, and it’s a big, clear idea that a lot of people can enter. That was it.'"

In describing the message of the film, Sirota stated: "Every politician is asked questions about the economy. What we have to do is bake that same attitude about climate into the coverage. The economy is the way we talk about politics. The livable atmosphere needs to be at the same level." In January 2022, Don't Look Up became Netflix's second biggest film of all time. Regarding the success of film, Sirota stated: "I never expected the movie to become a cultural phenomenon. ... I think the reason that happened is because it’s a movie about the here and now. This movie feels a lot like reality. Everybody has strong opinions on the here and now." Sirota also stated:

I'm most gratified to hear from climate scientists and people fighting corruption, and others who may feel that they've been marginalized. I know how they feel. I've spent a lot of my life working for causes that have been marginalized, and I've sometimes felt marginalized and berated and vilified. My hope is that in making those folks feel seen and recognized, and by giving them a voice, it further emboldens them and the movements that are trying to save our world.

== Books ==
=== Hostile Takeover ===
In May 2006, Random House's Crown Publishers released Sirota's book Hostile Takeover. The first chapter of the book was published in The New York Times in July 2006. Sirota read sections of his book in public. In the book, Sirota argued that corporate interests are driving U.S. economic policy. The book became a The New York Times bestseller on July 9, 2006, entering at No. 23 on the nonfiction list. The paperback edition came out a year later. Sirota's Hostile Takeover (2006) was reviewed by The New York Times critic Tobin Harshaw who described Sirota as a "Montana-based blogger with a take-no-prisoners mind-set" with "an admirably organized mind". Harshaw applauded some Sirota suggestions as "admirably specific, occasionally realistic and arguably on the side of the angels" and capable of bipartisan support, such as his recommendations for "regulating malpractice insurance for doctors... restoring state control over class-action laws... (and) forcing chief executives to certify corporate tax returns so they face liability for fraud." He felt Sirota was critical of "mainstream Democratic centrists". Harshaw criticized the writing style as "cliched" and "oppressive" and too lengthy and needing an editor, but admitted Sirota presented a "creditable analysis".

Sirota responded to Harshaw's review in a letter to the editor. Sirota denied his book was critical of mainstream Democrats but aimed squarely at "exposing Republican hypocrisy". He described his position as a "centrist exploration of the corruption of the entire system" that "isn't the fault of just one party or another". There was controversy in Washington, D.C., in 2007 about whether Sirota was a "journalist" or an "activist". While the Washington press corps tends to see him as an "activist", at one point he was criticized for skirting the rules about access to Congress, which would on some occasions deny activists access, by getting a "temporary intern's ID"; this gave him access to the Senate chamber, but he was criticized in The Washington Post afterward. He was described as having "pulled an end-run around the press galleries". Sirota denied he got "special access" and that such a claim was "just bizarre". He added: "I think a lot of reporters on the Hill want to monopolize access to our government as a way to preserve their monopoly on news I guess." Some analysts observed that conservative journalists were activists as well; one noted "[Weekly Standard columnist] Fred Barnes has credentials, he espouses political views."

=== The Uprising ===
Sirota's book The Uprising was released in June 2008. It was ranked 20th on The New York Times bestseller list on June 15, 2008. The book was also listed on The New York Times Political Bestseller list for the month of July 2008. Sirota made speeches about his book at prestigious venues such as Hofstra University.

A mostly positive review of The Uprising from Publishers Weekly described the book as chronicling "how ordinary citizens on the right and the left are marshaling their frustrations with the government into uprisings across the country." The reviewer cited "entertaining case studies" with a "conversational" tone and a fast-paced narrative with "numerous high notes." Sirota gave a "fine elucidation of continuing Democratic support for the Iraq War" and examined the "echo chamber qualities of beltway television shows like Hardball." The book presents "a rousing account of the local uprisings already in effect."

A Newark Star-Ledger political critic reviewing the book described Sirota as an "enterprising" reporter who used "resourceful" tactics to get entry into such venues as Capitol Hill, the Microsoft campus, an ExxonMobil stockholders meeting, and the Mexican border. In the book, Sirota attacks CNN star Lou Dobbs less for his "endless broadcasts on illegal immigration" but more for the way he "browbeats his staff and runs roughshod over the CNN management". The critic felt the book's "search for a national uprising is somewhat out of focus" but was a "lively read".

=== Back to Our Future ===
Sirota's book Back to Our Future was released in March 2011. This book explores "how the '80s have informed policies, politics, new pop culture, and society today, and how history and pop culture of times long past affected the '80s as well." Publishers Weekly states:

Sirota argues that the combination of Reagan, the "candidate of nostalgia"; hypermilitarist movies that re-demonized communism; and sophisticated marketing campaigns glorifying the cult of the individual led to our current culture's narcissism and obsessive pursuit of wealth and celebrity. In his effort to fit current trends to his overriding thesis, Sirota occasionally makes some sweeping statements, such as claiming the military's public relations campaign was so successful that Americans "never dare question" the military, ignoring the numerous anti–Iraq War protests and the outrage over the Abu Ghraib photographs. But the many of his arguments are well informed and sparkle with wit and irreverence.

In Wired, Jenny Williams states:

Back to Our Future is about much more than just the decade of the '80s. The author also dives into how society brought back the culture of the '50s and '60s in different ways, for different purposes. He talks about how society is manipulating our memories and using the rhetoric to guide people's thinking and voting habits.

== Political views ==
Sirota is a critic of neoliberal economic policies and has leveled criticism at the Clinton, George W. Bush, and Obama administrations. Sirota supported John Edwards in the 2008 Democratic party primaries. He has criticized the Democratic Leadership Council and other Democrats, who he claims have "sold out" to corporate interests and has argued that the term "centrist" is a misnomer in that these politicians are out of touch with public opinion. Sirota's article "The Democrats' Da Vinci Code" argues that leftist politicians are more successful in "red states" than the mainstream media have previously reported. He is an opponent of free trade policies, a supporter of fair trade, and an advocate of workers' rights and organized labor. His May 2007 speech at the Montana AFL–CIO Convention in Butte articulated many of his views. Sirota supported Sherrod Brown over Paul Hackett for the 2006 Senate election in Ohio and criticized Hackett's claims that he was "forced out" of the race by party elders as disingenuous. In 2008, Sirota stated on radio program Democracy Now! that he had cast an early vote for Democratic Party presidential candidate Barack Obama.

Sirota has been a strong supporter of the economic stimulus efforts of the Obama administration. However, he has criticized such efforts as insufficient and has strongly supported further stimulus efforts. Sirota was criticized by Fox News hosts and commentators Mark Steyn, Bill O'Reilly, Greg Gutfeld, and Robert Spencer in the wake of the Boston Marathon bombing for an article he wrote for Salon entitled "Let's Hope the Boston Marathon Bomber Is a White American". These critics asserted that Sirota downplayed the Islamic nature of the attack. Some other journalists and political analysts have criticized Sirota. In his article comparing two approaches to progressive politics, statistician Nate Silver disparaged Sirota's approach as "playing fast and loose with the truth and using some of the same demagogic precepts that the right wing does." Regarding Sirota's political analysis and projections, including his predictions during the 2008 presidential election, Al Giordano derided him as "an inverted compass: when Sirota says 'heads,' you can make a lot of money betting on 'tails.'"

In 2016, right-wing commentators at the conservative National Review and libertarian Reason upbraided Sirota for his 2013 Salon article entitled "Hugo Chavez's economic miracle". Sirota wrote in 2013 that Chavez was "no saint" but also that his socialist and redistributionist policies had led to Venezuela's GDP more than doubling and reduced poverty to the third-lowest level in South America. According to critics, Sirota overlooked that Venezuela's economic gains were based almost entirely on petroleum exports. In 2018, Sirota argued immediate action must be taken against the influence and power of oil and gas corporations to fight climate change, and Democrats must choose a side. He asked: "Will our political class behold the fossil fuel industry's sociopathy and realize that we face an existential choice between profits and ecological survival?"

== Personal life ==
Sirota lives in Denver with his wife Emily, and their two children. In January 2018, Emily Sirota announced her candidacy for a seat in the Colorado House of Representatives, promising a "bold, progressive agenda". In June, she won the Democratic primary in District 9, based in southeastern Denver. In November, she won the general election, with 72 percent of the vote to Republican Bob Lane's 28. He has lived in various cities around the country including Philadelphia, Chicago, San Diego, Washington, D.C., Helena, and Denver.

== Depiction in fiction ==
A character based on Sirota was featured in multiple episodes of the ABC TV series The Goldbergs. Sirota is close friends with the series creator Adam F. Goldberg. They have been friends since they attended the William Penn Charter School together. Goldberg's series is about his life growing up in the suburbs of Philadelphia. Sirota's character in the series is also named "David Sirota", and is portrayed by the actor Sam Kindseth. The character first appeared in the season 2 episode "Van People". This episode was dedicated to Sirota; the dedication shows archive footage of Sirota during his time at William Penn Charter School, as well as a brief clip of Sirota appearing on The Colbert Report.

== Bibliography ==
- Hostile Takeover: How Big Money and Corruption Conquered Our Government and How We Take It Back, 2006
- The Uprising: An Unauthorized Tour of the Populist Revolt Scaring Wall Street and Washington, 2008
- Back to Our Future: How the 1980s Explain the World We Live in Now—Our Culture, Our Politics, Our Everything, 2011
- Master Plan: The Hidden Plot To Legalize Corruption In America by David Sirota and Jared Jacang Maher. Lever Books. October 2025

== Filmography ==
Year	Title	Writer	Himself	Notes
2013	The '80s: The Decade That Made Us	Yes	Yes	Miniseries
2018	The '90s Greatest	Yes	Yes	Miniseries
2021	Don't Look Up	Story	No	Film writing debut Also co-producer Nominated — Academy Award for Best Original Screenplay
