= Jeff Cohen (media critic) =

American journalist and critic

- Born: November 10, 1951 (age 74); Detroit, Michigan, U.S.
- Education: University of Michigan; People's College of Law (JD)
- Occupations: Journalist, media critic, professor, pundit, writer, lawyer
- Known for: Founder of FAIR
- Awards: Hugh M. Hefner First Amendment Award 1993-1994 (with Norman Solomon)
- Website: http://www.jeffcohen.org/

Jeff B. Cohen (born November 10, 1951) is an American journalist, media critic, professor, and the founder of Fairness and Accuracy in Reporting (FAIR), a media watchdog group in the U.S. He is a retired associate professor of journalism at Ithaca College, where he was an endowed chair and the founding Director of the Park Center for Independent Media. Cohen has authored or co-authored five books that criticize media bias, many written with Norman Solomon. Between 1997 and 2002, he was a regular commentator for Fox News Channel's Fox News Watch, for MSNBC and CNN. He appeared in Outfoxed, a documentary critical of Fox News, and other documentaries.

== Biography ==
Cohen grew up in Detroit and did undergraduate study at the University of Michigan. He studied law at the People's College of Law in Los Angeles and was admitted to the California Bar in 1981. Cohen then worked as a journalist in the L.A. area and after law school was a lawyer for the ACLU. Cohen founded FAIR in 1986 and subsequently served as executive director and on the board of directors.

In 2002 Cohen left FAIR to work full-time for MSNBC as senior producer of Phil Donahue's show, Donahue. Previously, he briefly co-hosted CNN's Crossfire in 1996 and was a regular panelist on FNC's Fox News Watch from 1997 to 2002. Cohen had also been a return commentator at multiple networks.

Cohen was communications director for the Kucinich presidential campaign in 2003.

In 2006, Cohen became a volunteer journalist for OpEdNews and has since contributed over 50 articles.

In 2008, Cohen became the founding director of the Park Center for Independent Media at the Roy H. Park School of Communications at Ithaca College where he is an associate professor in the journalism department. The center studies, educates about, and advocates for non-corporate-controlled, independent news journalists and media outlets. Cohen additionally lectures across the country.

Beginning in the 1990s, Cohen, with Norman Solomon, wrote the "Media Beat" column syndicated in newspapers across the US, wrote occasional commentaries in various newspapers, and wrote a column for Brill's Content. He also has written investigative pieces for Rolling Stone, New Times, The Nation, Mother Jones, and other publications.

== Books ==
- Adventures in Medialand: Behind the News, Beyond the Pundits (1993) (with Norman Solomon) ISBN 978-1-56751-015-7
- Through the Media Looking Glass: Decoding Bias and Blather in the News (1995) (with Norman Solomon) ISBN 978-1-56751-049-2
- The Way Things Aren't: Rush Limbaugh's Reign of Error (1995) (with Steve Rendall and Jim Naureckas) ISBN 978-1-56584-260-1
- Wizards of Media Oz: Behind the Curtain of Mainstream News (1997) (with Norman Solomon)
- Cable News Confidential: My Misadventures in Corporate Media (2006) ISBN 978-0-9760621-6-5

== Documentary film ==
- All Governments Lie: Truth, Deception and the Spirit of I. F. Stone (2016) – co-producer

== See also ==
- Bob McChesney (Media Matters)
