= Nicholas Muellner =

American photographer, writer and curator

- Born: 1969 (age 56–57); Washington, D.C.
- Education: Temple University (MFA); Yale University (BA)
- Known for: Photography, writing
- Notable work: The Amnesia Pavilions; In Most Tides an Island
- Website: nicholasmuellner.com

Nicholas Muellner (born 1969) is an American photographer, writer and curator. He is best known for his photobooks The Amnesia Pavilions and In Most Tides an Island. The Amnesia Pavilions was named one of Time magazine's best photobooks of 2011, and In Most Tides an Island was shortlisted for the Paris Photo–Aperture Foundation's PhotoBook of the Year award in 2017. His works often combine images with text; treat themes related to repressed intimacy and human connection; and contain elements of autobiography, abstraction, photojournalism, and fiction. Many are set in the former Soviet Union and take gay men as their visual subjects.

== Early life and education ==
[I]n that odd summer, in which history lurched forward and back, like a train stopping abruptly in the wilderness at night ... change was measurable in people's willingness to describe their business plans and dreams of travel, their extortion rackets and erotic fantasies, to a young American with a camera.

— Muellner, describing his 1990 trip to the Soviet Union in The Amnesia Pavilions

Muellner was born in Washington, D.C., in 1969. He received his BA in comparative literature from Yale University and his MFA in photography from Tyler School of Art, Temple University. Muellner speaks Russian, and during his undergraduate studies in 1990, he received a student travel grant to visit the Soviet Union and photograph his rail journey from Moscow to Khabarovsk. While in Ulan-Ude, he befriended and fell in love with a young man named Aleksei Tsvetkov; they eventually lost touch. His 2009 return to Russia in search of Tsvetkov would later shape The Amnesia Pavilions.

== Career ==
=== Early career ===
In 2000, Muellner collaborated with programmer and artist Richard Harrod on The Evolution of Closed Systems and Other Propagandas. The project was an interactive version of Pong adapted to include quotations from Mao Zedong, tips for effective salesmanship, and commentary by Muellner and Harrod on intimacy and personal relationships. It was designed as a metaphor for human–state interaction.

Since 2002, Muellner has been a professor of media arts, sciences, and studies at the Roy H. Park School of Communications at Ithaca College. He is co-director of the college's image–text MFA program. In 2009, Muellner published a book titled The Photograph Commands Indifference.

=== From The Amnesia Pavilions to In Most Tides an Island ===
In 2011, Muellner published The Amnesia Pavilions, a photobook chronicling his 1990 and 1992 trips to present-day Russia and his return to Ulan-Ude to look for Tsvetkov in 2009. Time magazine named it one of the best photobooks of 2011. Muellner adapted The Amnesia Pavilions to a multimedia format for Triple Canopy.

In 2013, he created a photographic body of work called The Nautiloid Heart, which was exhibited at Noshowspace in London and at the CEPA Gallery in Buffalo, New York. While in the Caribbean photographing for The Nautiloid Heart, Muellner began to correspond with closeted gay men in Russia and Ukraine, including several in Crimea, shortly before the Russian annexation of that region. In an interview with Aperture magazine, Muellner explained how this gave rise to the concept that would become In Most Tides an Island:

In my unfinished island fiction, I had attributed a dream of my own—almost unaltered—to the primary character, in the form of a bedtime story: the vision of an 'almost-island' where beautiful men nurtured and murdered narrative. I suspected that the Crimean Peninsula was that almost-island, and that I needed to find those men.

Muellner traveled to Russia and Ukraine to interview and photograph the men, and he published their stories in In Most Tides an Island in 2017. The book reports on the isolation, secrecy, and repression that shape the men's lives. It juxtaposes this content with images from The Nautiloid Heart, which are repurposed as a narrative about a woman alone on a Caribbean island. Muellner connects the two worlds with the theme of solitude, and the work also includes commentary on the internet as a means of indulgence and temporary escape from loneliness. In Most Tides an Island was shortlisted for the Paris Photo–Aperture Foundation's 2017 PhotoBook of the Year award. The same year, The San Francisco Foundation awarded Muellner the John Gutmann Photography Fellowship.

=== Talks and exhibitions ===
Muellner has had solo exhibitions in the US, the UK, and Russia. Among other locations, his work has been shown at ClampArt and at the Stark Gallery in New York City, as well as at Locks Gallery and at Project Room in Philadelphia. He has given readings at MoMA PS1, the Carnegie Museum of Art, and the Museum of Contemporary Photography.

=== Affiliations ===
Since 2018, Muellner has been a fellow of the John Simon Guggenheim Memorial Foundation.

== Influences ==
Muellner cites James Agee and Walker Evans' Let Us Now Praise Famous Men, as well as the work of Ralph Gibson and Ralph Eugene Meatyard, as inspiration for his use of image–text relationships to tell stories. One of his earliest influences to this end was Duane Michals, whose books he said "seduced [him] not only with their mystical-whimsical narratives of word-image interplay, but with their spiritually gauzed-over homoeroticism."

Muellner's photographic style is influenced by 1950s New York street photography, 19th-century landscape paintings, and 1990s German conceptual photography. When he was 19, he discovered Nan Goldin's The Ballad of Sexual Dependency. Of this body of photographs, he said, "Looking compulsively at [it] ... electrified me. I was so gripped by that expression of erotic, frank, immediate visual intimacy. But I also learned, eventually, that I was nothing like that. My version of the personal, of processing intimacy, includes the awareness of doubts, paradoxes, and distancing effects."

== Selected works ==
- Muellner, Nicholas (2019). Lacuna Park: Essays and Other Adventures in Photography. London: SPBH Editions. ISBN 978-1999814489.
- Muellner, Nicholas (2017). In Most Tides an Island. London: SPBH Editions. ISBN 978-1999814427.
- Keene, John; Muellner, Nicholas (2016). Grind. Ithaca: ITI Press. ISBN 978-0996735124.
- Muellner, Nicholas (2011). The Amnesia Pavilions. Ithaca: A-Jump Books. ISBN 978-0977765584.
- Muellner, Nicholas (2009). The Photograph Commands Indifference. Ithaca: A-Jump Books. ISBN 978-0977765539.
- Crane, Cathy; Muellner, Nicholas, eds. (2008). (1968). Cambridge: Cambridge Scholars Publishing. ISBN 978-1847186416.
- Muellner, Nicholas (2005). Moscow Plastic Arts. Arcadia University Art Gallery. ISBN 978-0976215400.
