= Janine Jackson =

American journalist

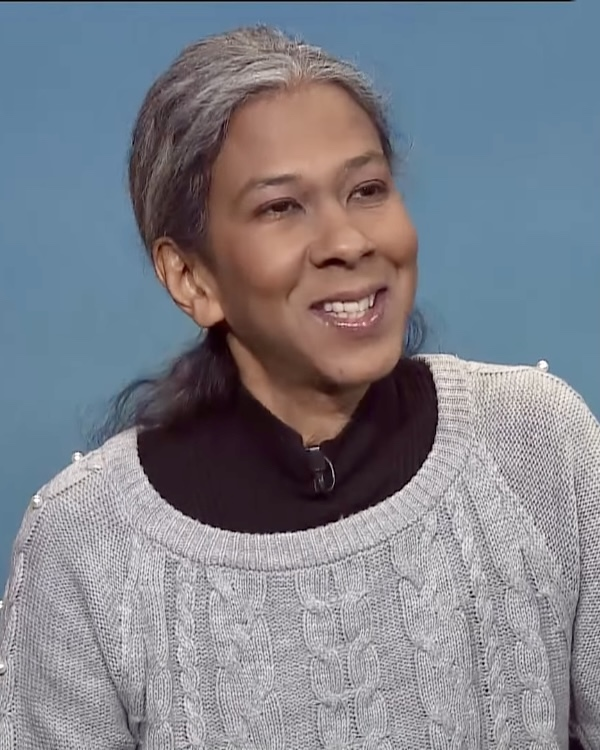
Janine Jackson interviewed on the Laura Flanders Show in 2019

Janine Jackson (born January 30, 1965, in Wilmington, Delaware) is the program director of FAIR (Fairness and Accuracy in Reporting), and the host and producer of FAIR's syndicated radio show CounterSpin—a weekly program of media criticism airing on more than 150 stations around the country.

Jackson graduated with a B.A. from Sarah Lawrence College and has an M.A. in sociology from the New School for Social Research. She also attended University College London. She became FAIR's research director in 1992.

She is a frequent contributor to FAIR's magazine Extra!, reporting on media coverage of labor and economics, racism in the media, and media regulation. She co-edited The FAIR Reader: An Extra! Review of Press and Politics in the '90s (Westview Press). Her articles have appeared in many other publications, including In These Times and the UAW's Solidarity, and in such books as Civil Rights Since 1787 (NYU Press) and Censored 2000 (Seven Stories Press).

Jackson has testified to the Senate Communications Subcommittee on budget reauthorization for the Corporation for Public Broadcasting. She has appeared on ABC's Nightline, NBC's Geraldo, and CNBC's Inside Business, among other outlets.

In 1997 she married Jim Naureckas, the editor of Extra!.
