= Shirley Collado =

American academic and former president of Ithaca College

Shirley M. Collado

9th President of Ithaca College
- In office July 1, 2017 – August 29, 2021
- Succeeded by: La Jerne Terry Cornish

Personal details
- Citizenship: United States of America
- Spouse: A. Van Jordan
- Education: Vanderbilt University (BS); Duke University (MA, PhD)
- Occupation: Chief executive, College Track

Shirley M. Collado is an American higher education executive and academic administrator. She has been president and chief executive of College Track, an American college completion program, since 2022. Collado served as the ninth president of Ithaca College from 2017 to 2021, and was the second woman to hold the post and the first person of color. She is the first Dominican American to be named president of a four-year college in the United States.

== Early life and education ==
Collado grew up in Brooklyn, the child of Dominican immigrants; her father drove a taxi and her mother worked in a factory. Collado is a first generation college student. She enrolled at Vanderbilt University in 1990, participating in a program called The Posse Foundation, which identifies, recruits and trains students with academic and leadership potential, and places them in cohorts at institutions that award full-tuition scholarships. Collado was one of five students who enrolled at Vanderbilt as the first Posse cohort, and graduated with a Bachelor of Science in Psychology and Human and Organizational Development in 1994. She went on to earn an M.A. and Ph.D. in 1999 from the Department of Psychology and Neuroscience at Duke University. Her dissertation was titled "The Perceived Racism Scale for Latina/os: a Multidimensional Assessment of the Experience of Racism among Latina/os."

== Career ==
After completing her doctorate in clinical psychology, Collado worked in community mental health, then returned to The Posse Foundation where she spent six years as executive vice president. She was appointed as vice president for Institutional Planning and Diversity at Middlebury College in Vermont in 2007.

In 2009, she was named vice-president for institutional planning and community engagement at Lafayette College.

In 2010, she returned to Middlebury College to become an associate professor of psychology, dean of the college and vice president of student affairs at Middlebury College.

From 2014 to 2024, Collado served as a trustee on Vanderbilt University’s Board of Trust. She was appointed trustee emerita in 2024.

In January 2015, Collado was appointed executive vice chancellor and chief operating officer at Rutgers University-Newark, where she led the development of the university's Honors Living-Learning Community.

On July 1, 2017, Collado became president of Ithaca College, replacing outgoing Tom Rochon to become the ninth president in the college's then-125-year history and the first person of color to hold the role. As president, Collado led the creation and implementation of the College’s strategic plan, Ithaca Forever. The plan provided a framework for the College’s sustainability and to become a model for student success, engagement and well-being, helping students to develop their unique potential.

Collado announced in July 2021 that she would step down as president of Ithaca College to become president and chief executive of College Track, a program supporting college completion. Collado was appointed president emerita by Ithaca College at the completion of her term.

In January 2022, Collado assumed the role of president and chief executive of College Track.

Collado is a member of the boards of IntermediaryEd, Kids First Chicago, National Association for College Admission Counseling, and StarRez. She also served on the board of Excelencia in Education and is a founding member of President's Alliance on Higher Education and Immigration.

In October 2022, Collado was appointed to serve as a Senior Fellow at Carnegie Foundation for the Advancement of Teaching.

== Personal life ==
Collado is married to poet and Stanford University professor, A. Van Jordan.

Preceded by Thomas Rochon	President of Ithaca College; 2021–present	Succeeded by La Jerne Terry Cornish
