= James J. Whalen =

American psychologist and educational administrator

James J. Whalen (March 5, 1927 – September 6, 2001) was an American psychologist and educational administrator, who served as president of Ithaca College from 1975 to 1997.

== Biography ==
As Ithaca's sixth president, James J. Whalen led the college through a time of unprecedented growth: in academic and co-curricular programs, in the size and caliber of the faculty, in the number and quality of the students, and in physical and fiscal resources.

Ithaca's endowment and reserves grew during Whalen's 22-year tenure from $9 million to some $150 million; total assets quadrupled to over $300 million. Ithaca's enrollment rose by over 25 percent, the number of degree programs more than doubled, and the size of the faculty increased by over 50 percent. In addition, 15 academic and residential buildings were added to the campus and most of the existing facilities were completely renovated. To honor his accomplishments, the School of Music's greatly expanded facility was dedicated as the James J. Whalen Center for Music in 1999.

Upon stepping down as president, Whalen was named president emeritus and awarded the honorary degree of doctor of humane letters. In 1999 the Ithaca College Alumni Association named in his honor the James J. Whalen Meritorious Service Award, which recognizes distinguished achievements and contributions to the college by non-graduates.

Born in Pottsville, Pennsylvania, Whalen graduated in 1950 from Franklin and Marshall College where he was a member of Phi Kappa Tau fraternity. He held master's and doctoral degrees in clinical psychology from Pennsylvania State University, earned in 1952 and 1955, respectively. A licensed clinical psychologist and member of the U.S. Naval Reserve, Whalen practiced at the Veterans Administration Hospital in Pittsburgh from 1955 to 1958. Before coming to Ithaca College he served as president of Newton College, in Massachusetts. He had previously been executive vice president of Ohio University and assistant director and member of the faculty of the European division of the University of Maryland University College. He was awarded honorary doctor of laws degrees from both Newton College of the Sacred Heart and Ohio University. Whalen was an honorary member of the Delta chapter of Phi Mu Alpha Sinfonia national music fraternity.

Whalen was active in state and national higher education associations. He served as chairman of the boards of directors of the American Council on Education, the National Association of Independent Colleges and Universities, and New York's Commission on Independent Colleges and Universities. His contributions to college athletics included chairing the Division III subcommittee of the Presidents Commission of the National Collegiate Athletic Association and co-chairing the NCAA Task Force on Gender Equity. He also served as chair of the board of visitors of Air University (United States Air Force) and member of the board of visitors of the Marine Corps University.

In a 1986 Exxon Foundation study, President Whalen was named one of the nation's top-100 higher education chief executive officers. He received the USAF Exceptional Service Award in 1990 and was made an honorary member of the Joint Chiefs of Staff in 1995. In 1997 NAICU gave him the Henry Paley Memorial Award for outstanding service.

Whalen died September 6, 2001, in Boston.

Preceded by Ellis L. Phillips Jr.	President of Ithaca College; 1975 – 1997	Succeeded by Peggy R. Williams
