= Newton College of the Sacred Heart =

Women's college in Newton Centre, Massachusetts (1946–1975)

Coordinates: 42°20′30.8″N 71°11′35.7″W

- Motto: Caritas Christi Urget Nos
- Motto in English: "The love of Christ compels us"
- Type: Private women's liberal arts college
- Active: September 8, 1946–May 23, 1975
- Religious affiliation: Catholic
- President: James J. Whalen
- Location: 885 Centre Street, Newton, Massachusetts, 02459, United States
- Campus: 40 acres (16 ha); Suburban
- Newspaper: The 885

Newton College of the Sacred Heart (NCSH) was a small women's liberal arts college in Newton, Massachusetts. Founded in 1946 by the Society of the Sacred Heart, Newton College remained an independent, all-girls institution until beginning its merger with Boston College on June 28, 1974.

The campus is located approximately seven miles west of downtown Boston. At the time of its closing, Newton College offered Bachelor's of Arts (B.A.) and Bachelor's of Science (B.S.) degrees, with limited graduate credit in select specializations. Newton College, unlike other all-girl institutions in the area, was seen as a, "...serious academic enterprise, designed to underline the importance of higher education for Catholic women in modern America". Over its thirty-year history, Newton would enroll over three thousand students from all over the world.

Today, the 40-acre (16 ha), 15-building Newton campus is the home of the Boston College Law School, as well as dormitories for first-year Boston College students and athletic facilities for BC's field hockey, lacrosse, and soccer teams. The campus is approximately 1.5 miles (2 km) away from the main Chestnut Hill campus of Boston College and is serviced by the BC Shuttle.

== History ==
=== Origins ===
The idea for Newton College traces back to the Society of the Sacred Heart's arrival in Boston, Massachusetts in 1880. There they established the "Boston Academy of the Sacred Heart", an all-girls school located in the South End. In 1925, citing the need for more space, Boston Academy moved to the Loren Towle Estate in Newton and was renamed Newton Country Day School.

As World War II drew to a close, the Religious of the Sacred Heart, backed by the recently appointed Archbishop Richard Cushing, announced their intent to establish a higher education institution in the surrounding area. Cushing's desire to increase Catholic presence in Boston's suburbs paired with The Society's aim of increasing higher education access to women resulted in the establishment of Newton College of the Sacred Heart, which welcomed its inaugural class in September 1946.

=== Expansion ===
The original campus was the former estate of George F. Schrafft, owner of the Schrafft Candy Company, which was purchased by the Religious of the Sacred Heart on September 8, 1945. At that time, the property consisted of just two buildings spread across 20 acres; the Schrafft house and the adjacent four-car garage. The house was renamed "Barat House", after the founder of the Society of the Sacred Heart, Madeleine Sophie Barat, RSCJ, and was remodeled to serve multiple purposes as the first administration building, library, chapel, and residence hall. The accompanying garage, renamed "St. Mary's", was adapted for use as classroom and assembly space.

=== Merger with Boston College ===
Like many all-women's colleges during the 1960s and 1970s, its applications and profits were hurt by the push for coeducation and lessening of federal funding during the Vietnam War. Rising costs coupled with lower enrollments soon put Newton in severe financial uncertainty. Despite numerous fundraising efforts, by the end of 1973, “It became obvious...that the required monies were not forthcoming.”

In March 1974, a joint announcement was made by President James J. Whalen of Newton and President J. Donald Monan, S.J. of Boston College that the two institutions would begin consolidating. As part of the merger, Boston College assumed responsibility for paying off Newton's debt (which at the time of closing was over $5 million) and also continued the undergraduate program for Newton's students through graduation. Juniors and Seniors were given traditional Newton College graduations with the class of 1975 being the final Newton ceremony. Of the remaining students, sophomores were given a choice to have either "Newton College of the Sacred Heart" or "Boston College" on their degrees. Since the freshman class would ultimately spend more time as BC students than as Newton students, they were only given BC degrees.

Boston College would also begin to oversee services and programs for the approximately 3,000 living alumnae of Newton. Each year, BC hosts reunion weekend events for Newton alumnae alongside their BC counterparts. In 1971, Newton founded the Institute for Open Education, which would later become Cambridge College. In 1997, with the assistance of Newton's alumnae association, Boston College created the Newton College Alumnae Professorship in Western Culture.

== Buildings ==
=== Barat House ===
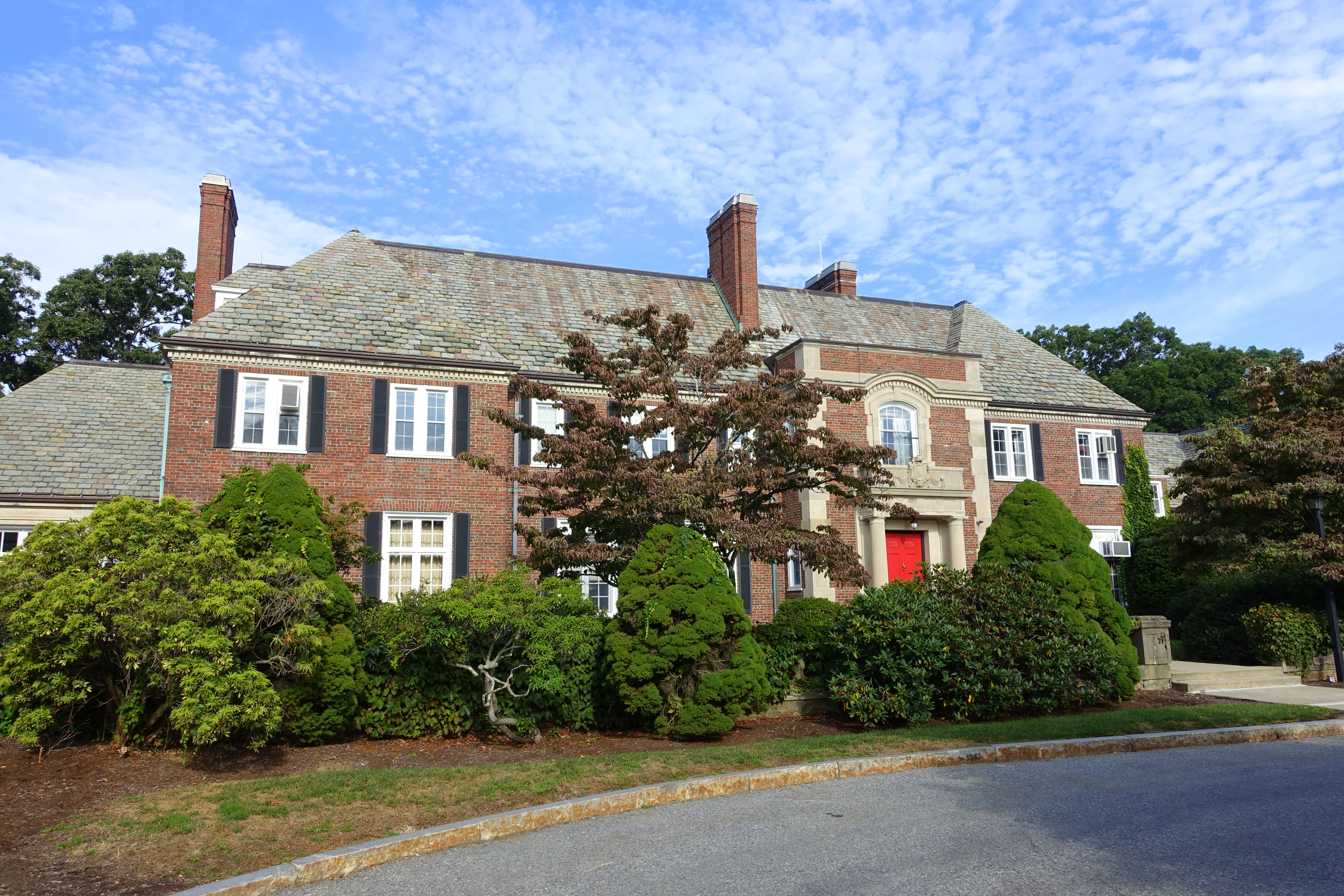
Barat House, Front Exterior, 2019

Originally an administrative building, chapel, library, and residence hall, today Barat House serves as offices, event space, and is home to the Rappaport Center for Law and Public Policy. Barat House is the oldest building on the campus, having gone through many transformations based on the needs of both Newton and eventually BC. There had been proposals for Barat to be the home of the President of BC as a means of unifying the two campuses however it was eventually decided the president would maintain an office there instead. For a period, a small cohort of BC's Jesuit community occupied the section of Barat that had previously housed the Religious of the Sacred Heart. Despite being one of the most popular recreational spaces on Newton, the basement lounge in Barat has been closed since December 2013 pending repairs.

=== Boston College Law School ===
When the BC Law School moved to the Newton Campus in August 1975, it occupied many of the former administrative and academic buildings of Newton College. This included the majority of Stuart House, the Barry Pavilion, and the Kenny-Cottle Library. BC Law was seen as the most logical choice for relocation to the Newton Campus as the law curriculum had (and still maintains) total independence from undergraduate study at BC and many felt the law program's, "...prestige would be enhanced by Newton's environment and facilities".

However, by the early 1990s, many of the law school's facilities needed upgrades and growth in enrollment required additional space. Plans for a new library and classrooms emerged in mid 1993, and by the following year, groundbreaking had taken place. The Law Library would come first, opening on January 9, 1996, with phase two of the project seeing the demolition of the Barry Pavilion to make way for more updated facilities. Named the "Law School East Wing", phase two was completed in January 1999, reconnecting the Law Library and Stuart House. To date, this was the last time BC significantly altered the Newton Campus.

=== Cottage Garage ===
Located at the base of Hardey Hill, the Cottage Garage served multiple needs for Newton College, including a tea and sandwich room, student parking, and athletic storage. The space is now used for storage of maintenance and groundskeeping tools/vehicles.

=== Cushing House ===
The first purpose-built dormitory on the Newton College campus, Cushing House was named in honor of Cardinal Cushing for his instrumental work in establishing Newton and his continued support for expansion. Despite being built as a dormitory, Newton College opted to continue its practice of referring to student residences as “houses” since, until Cushing was built, all of them were former homes. This trend would continue will all dormitories built for Newton as a way of honoring the school's history.

Cushing remains a residence hall for first-year Boston College students and is the only building on the Newton Campus named after a man.

=== Duchesne House ===
Following the success of the dormitory model with Cushing House, ground was broken on two new residence halls which were to replace the old Duchesne House. The two would be built side by side, a few yards away from their predecessor, and carry on the Duchesne name, while the former residence would become the new library and study space.

On September 17, 1957, "Duchesne East" and "Duchesne West" opened as the second new dormitory complex for Newton College. While technically two separate buildings, Duchesne East and West are connected by lounges on the basement and first floor, effectively making them one residential community. It is still a residence hall for first-year Boston College students, referred to simply as "Duchesne" but maintains the "East" and "West" titles administratively to help delineate between the two wings.

=== Hardey House ===
Formerly the estate of railway magnate and Colby College founder Gardner Colby, in September 1949, Newton College purchased the Rutherford Estate which included a Victorian home and a few acres of land which had been situated directly next to the Schrafft property. The home, renamed "Hardey House" after Mary Aloysia Hardey, RSCJ served as a residence for students from 1949 until its demolition in December 1958.

Construction immediately began on a new Hardey House which would be built in the same dormitory style as Cushing House and the new Duchesne House. The new Hardey was built directly next to Cushing House and the two were connected via a glass breezeway. The two residence halls are considered one residential community by Boston College, nicknamed "HardeyCush".

=== Kenny-Cottle Library ===
A wing of the expanded Stuart House, the Kenny-Cottle library was built as reading and study space to replace the older facility which was occupying the old Duchesne House. The library was named in honor of Mother Eleanor S. Kenny, the first President of Newton College, and the Cottle family who had donated heavily to the construction fund. When Newton College merged with BC, the library continued to serve as the law school library until the new Law Library opened on January 9, 1996. Today, the space houses offices for law school faculty, classrooms, mail facilities, and storage for all Boston College libraries.

Beginning in the Summer of 2026, a section of the library is currently being renovated to add additional study and lounge space for first-year BC students. The space is slated to open in the Fall of 2026.

=== Keyes House ===
Named in honor of Mother Louise Keyes, RSCJ, Keyes House like Duchesne House, is divided into "North" and "South" structures that are connected by lounges. "Keyes South" was the first to open simply named "Keyes House", and included a new mailroom facility and the Spellman Infirmary. Workers' strikes resulted in delays in construction of "Keyes North" which would open a few years later in 1969.

=== St. Mary's House ===
Originally the garage for the Schrafft family, St. Mary's was converted into some of the earliest classroom and meeting spaces for Newton. When the structure was moved to make way for Trinity Chapel, it was converted into science laboratories and classrooms. When Newton merged with BC, the need for dedicated science labs on Newton was no longer required and as a result St. Mary's was repurposed as miscellaneous storage. It currently serves as music rehearsal and practice space.

=== Stuart House ===
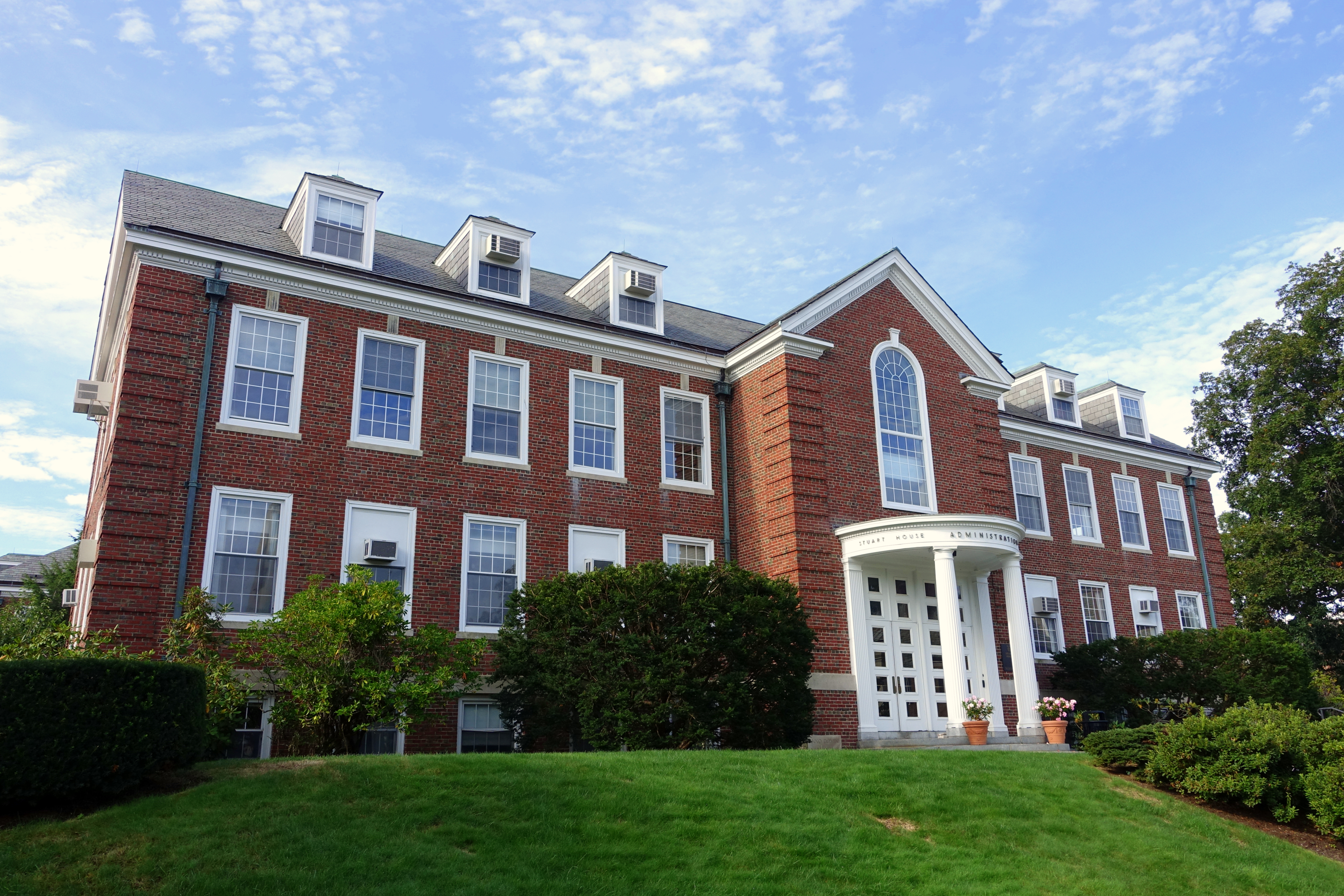
Stuart House, 2019. The facade has remained unchanged since 1946

The earliest building constructed solely for Newton College, Stuart House served as additional classroom, administrative, and residential space. The original structure would see numerous additions as Newton expanded including a cafeteria and more classrooms. Today, Stuart is the administrative offices and classroom space for BC Law, and also dining locations for law and undergraduate students.

=== Trinity Chapel ===
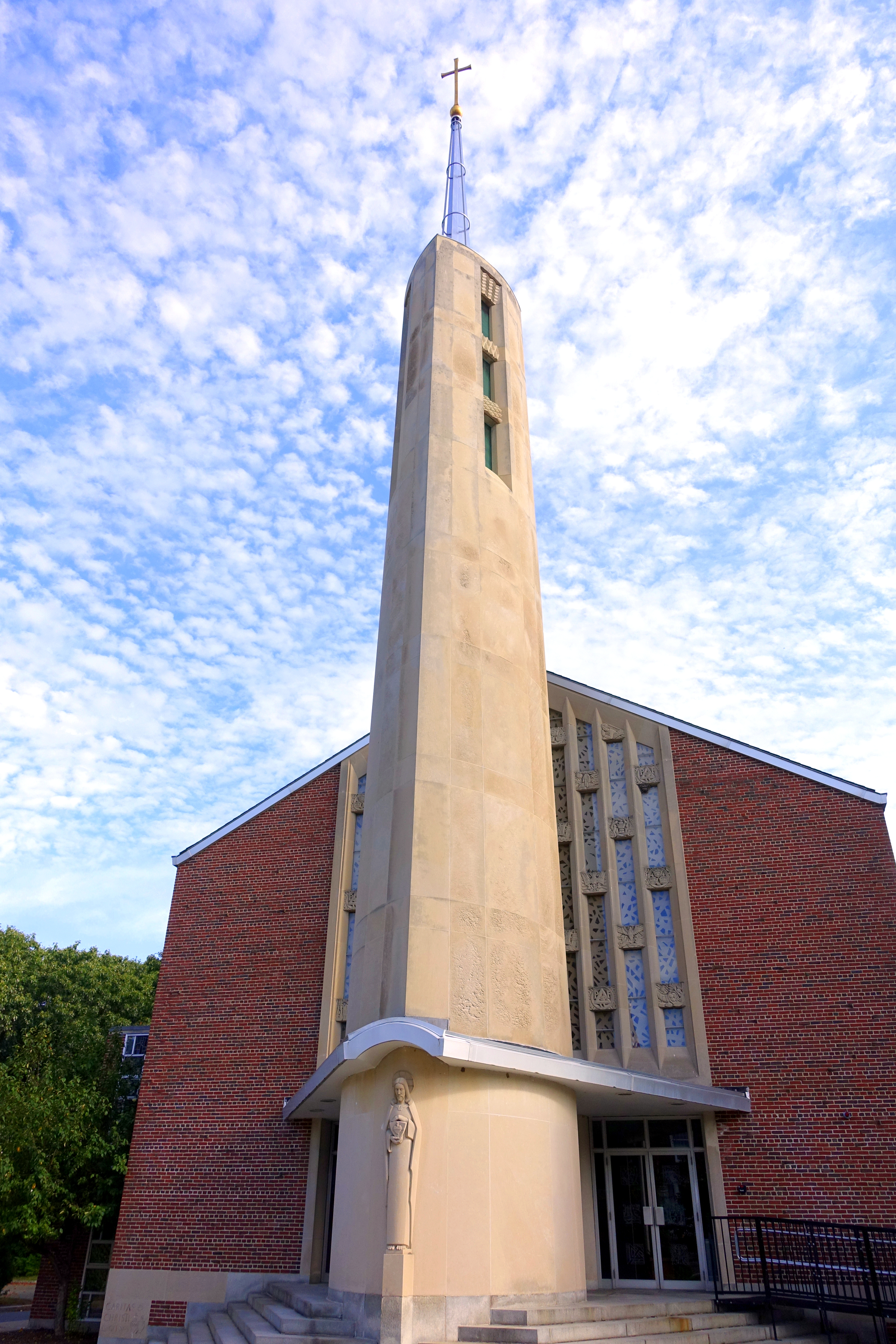
Trinity Chapel, 2019

As enrollment at Newton continued to grow, the need for a larger chapel space became more prevalent. The area chosen for the new chapel was the current location of St. Mary's House due to its large, central location on campus. Rather than demolish St. Mary's, the building was relocated a few hundred feet away where it remains today.

In 1962, Trinity Chapel opened as both a place of worship and included a large multipurpose room in the basement for studying and events. The building was designed to reflect what at that time was considered "modern Catholic architecture". Trinity still functions as a chapel and hosts numerous concerts and programs for BC as well as outside community groups. It is also the main study space for undergraduate students living on Newton.

=== Quonset Hut ===
The original structure, erected in 1948, was a Quonset hut referred to as the "Playhouse Gymnasium" that functioned as a theater, dance floor, and athletic facility for Newton College. Following the merger with BC, the space continued to perform the same function for first-year students on Newton but was officially renamed the "Quonset Hut" as it had affectionately become known.

On October 15, 1988, at approximately 2:30am, a fire broke out in the hut that destroyed much of the building. The cause of the fire was believed to have started in the boiler room and was ruled an accident. Plans were drawn up almost immediately to rebuild a new hut in same spot as the old one however costs and delays meant the project stalled. It would not be until the Fall of 1991 that the new facility would finally open as a basketball court, exercise space, and recreational lounge. Still in use, the Quonset Hut is the main gym space for undergraduates on the Newton Campus.

== See also ==
- List of current and historical women's universities and colleges in the United States
