= WICB =

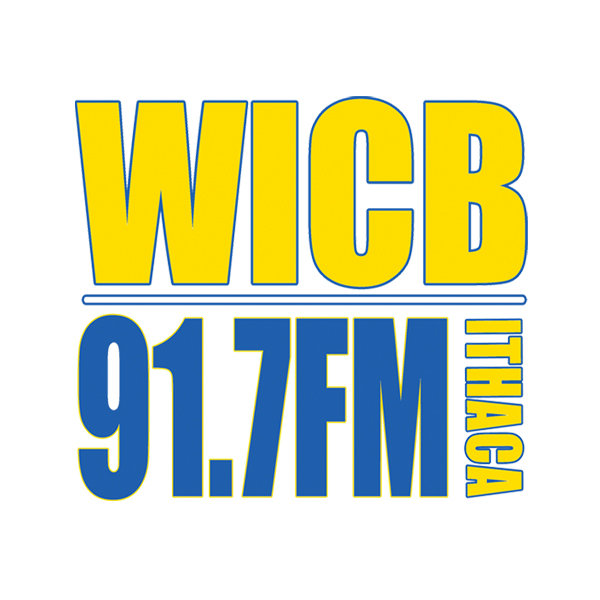
- Ithaca, New York; United States
- Broadcast area: Ithaca, New York
- Frequency: 91.7 MHz

Programming
- Format: Alternative
- Affiliations: ABC News Radio

Ownership
- Owner: Ithaca College
- Sister stations: vicradio.org

History
- First air date: 1948
- Former call signs: WITJ-FM
- Call sign meaning: Ithaca College Broadcasting

Technical information
- Licensing authority: FCC
- Facility ID: 29274
- Class: A
- ERP: 4,100 watts
- HAAT: 41.3 meters (135 ft)
- Transmitter coordinates: 42°25′7.00″N 76°29′39.00″W

Links
- Public license information: Public file; LMS
- Webcast: Listen live
- Website: wicb.org

WICB (91.7 FM) is a college radio station licensed to serve Ithaca, New York, United States. Established in 1941 and receiving its FCC license in 1948, the station is owned by Ithaca College.

WICB broadcasts an alternative music format to the greater Ithaca area. Along with alternative music, the student-run radio station reserves programming for several different formats—including jazz, reggae, blues, hip-hop, sports, news, and more. The station features news programming from ABC News.

WICB also has a News and Sports Department run by student executives, featuring daily live newscasts and sportscasts, plus weekly talk shows and play-by-play sports coverage.

The radio station broadcasts locally at 91.7FM, as well as online streaming at wicb.org, iHeartRadio, TuneIn, and their own WICB app.

== History ==
In 1941, make-shift radio studios were built at 120 E. Buffalo Street in Ithaca, New York. It was a grassroots attempt at broadcasting with little equipment and without transmitters, just room-to-room public address type broadcasting. In 1947, Ithaca College's Radio Department moved to expanded quarters at 101 West Court Street and applied to the FCC for a non-commercial educational FM broadcast license. The FCC granted Ithaca College the license in 1948 and the station went on-the-air operating at 88.1 FM with 10 watts of power and the call letters WITJ-FM. On March 1, 1957, the call letters were changed to WICB-FM with a new dial setting of 91.7 FM.

WICB's studio moved to the basement of Dillingham Center in 1968, then to the Roy H. Park School of Communications in 1989.

92 WICB is an affiliate of both ABC News and the Associated Press, and has active news and sports departments, which cover Ithaca College sports teams including football, soccer, baseball, softball, basketball, volleyball, wrestling and lacrosse.

The radio station is Ithaca College's only FCC-licensed broadcast facility, and is in operation 24 hours a day, 365 days a year.

The Radio Station currently operates with 4,100 watts of effective radiated power that is able to reach much of Tompkins County and beyond. The signal is capable of reaching nearly 250,000 listeners from parts of Northern Pennsylvania up to Lake Ontario. The station also streams its programming live at wicb.org, iHeartRadio, TuneIn, and on the WICB app.

The station has a long-standing annual tradition of playing the radio station of Ithaca College's rival, SUNY Cortland, in a football game called the "Cortaca Mic". The game takes place in Cortland the evening before the annual Cortaca Jug game.

WICB is run almost entirely by a staff of student DJs and executives. Students of all majors are encouraged to work on the radio. First-year students all the way up to seniors at Ithaca College are allowed to be a part of WICB, though there is a required shadowing process along with an air check and written quiz. Aside from a technical and upper management support staff, all programming, talent coordination and promotions decisions are left up to a rotating executive board of students.

== Awards and honors ==
WICB was recognized and ranked the #1 college radio station out of 364 colleges by the Princeton Review in 2010, 2014, and most recently in 2016. The Princeton Review's 2023 edition of "The Best 388 Colleges" ranked Ithaca College's WICB at #3 in the Best College Radio Station category.

WICB has been honored as a top radio station in the College Media Association's annual Pinnacle Awards competition. The station took first place as Four-Year Radio Station of the Year in 2020. It was named an honorable mention in the same category in 2021 and placed third in 2019.

In 2016, readers of the Ithaca Journal voted WICB as "Best Local Radio Station" In 2005 and 2010, readers of the Ithaca Times voted 92 WICB "Best Radio Station." In 2008, WICB won an mtvU Woodie Award for Best College Radio Station.

WICB is an active member of College Broadcasters, Inc (CBI) and consistently places in the finals for the annual National Student Media Electronic Convention hosted by CBI. The station has also won awards from the New York State Broadcasters Association (NYSBA), Broadcast Education Association (BEA), Society of Professional Journalists (SPJ) and Syracuse Press Club, recognizing outstanding news and sports coverage, plus on-air production and music programming.

== Programming ==
WICB's staple format is modern rock. While broadcasting modern rock, the station is run similarly to a commercial modern rock station, with the inclusion of playlists planned by the programming and music departments that include leeway for listener requests and DJ choices. Listeners are encouraged to call or text in and request songs for the DJs to play. WICB's full programming schedule is online at wicb.org/schedule.

Other major programming genres include Weekend Rhythms, Jazz Impressions and a number of specialty shows. Weekend Rhythms includes rap, hip-hop, and R&B. Jazz Impressions runs during the lunchtime every weekday and showcases both classic and modern jazz artists. Other specialty programs are run by both student DJs and community members. Many of the shows have developed loyal listener bases from being on the air for a number of years. Shows come from genres like the popularly syndicated Acoustic Café, blues, Broadway, reggae, and Americana/folk not normally heard on public airwaves. WICB also airs "Breakfast With the Beatles," the longest-running ongoing Beatles show in the U.S.

Outside of mainstream music, WICB also provides an outlet for local bands. There is both a specialty show specifically for local music as well as segments throughout the day where local music is scheduled to be played. Very often bands will be brought in to perform live during "Homebrew" in addition to playing recordings from local groups. "Homebrew," the station's weekly local music show, airs Tuesday evenings from 8:00 - 10:00 PM and received a New York State Broadcasters Association (NYSBA) 2023 Excellence in Broadcasting Award in the Outstanding Radio Show (College Radio Division) category.

Aside from music, WICB has expanded both sports and talk radio segments in recent years. WICB has also expanded into music, news and sports podcasts. Both the News and Sports departments at WICB are directed by student executives, with students providing live broadcasts during the morning and late afternoon. The WICB Sports department is responsible for broadcasting at nearly all major sporting events involving the Ithaca College Bombers, and live sportscasts 5 days a week. The WICB News department is responsible for live newscasts 5 days a week, as well as producing the weekly news show Ithaca Now. It also produces a weekday news podcast called The Latest.

== See also ==
- College radio
- List of college radio stations in the United States
