= Extra! =

American magazine of media criticism

- Editor: Jim Naureckas
- Former editors: Martin A. Lee
- Categories: News media
- Frequency: Monthly
- Publisher: Deborah Thomas
- First issue: June 1987
- Company: FAIR
- Country: United States
- Based in: New York City
- Language: English
- Website: http://www.fair.org/index.php?page=4
- ISSN: 0895-2310

Extra! is a monthly magazine of media criticism published by the media watch group FAIR. First published in 1987, its first full-time editor was Martin A. Lee. Since 1990, it has been edited by Jim Naureckas. The magazine covers a wide variety of media issues in the form of analytical essays, features publications on media commentators, and book reviews.

Extra! was published six times a year until January 2009, when it switched to monthly. Contributors include Peter Hart, Janine Jackson, Julie Hollar, Laura Flanders, Howard Friel, Noam Chomsky, Stephen Maher, Michael Corcoran, Seth Ackerman, Beau Hodai, and Edward S. Herman.
