= La Jerne Terry Cornish =

American academic administrator

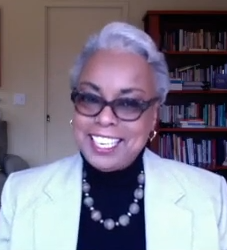
- Cornish in 2020

10th President of Ithaca College
- Incumbent
- Assumed office March 7, 2022; Interim: August 30, 2021 – March 6, 2022
- Preceded by: Shirley Collado

Personal details
- Born: La Jerne Terry
- Children: 1
- Education: Goucher College (BA, MEd); University of Maryland, Baltimore County (PhD)

La Jerne Terry Cornish is an American academic administrator, who has been the current president of Ithaca College since August 2021. She was previously the provost, executive vice president, and interim president at Ithaca College. Cornish was a professor and the associate provost for undergraduate students at Goucher College.

== Early life and education ==
Cornish was born to Dolores Stokes and Joe W. Terry. She has two brothers.

Cornish completed a B.A. in English at Goucher College in 1983. She worked as a language arts instructor for Baltimore City Public Schools from 1983 to 1992. She was the coordinator of the Canton Project (Maryland's Tomorrow) from 1992 to 1998. Cornish earned a M.Ed. with a concentration in at-risk students from Goucher College in 1994. She also worked as a house principal at the Highland House from 1996 to 1998. Cornish was an assistant principal at Canton Middle School in 1998.

She earned a Ph.D. in language, literacy, and culture at the University of Maryland, Baltimore County in May 2005. Her dissertation was titled Do you See What I See? An Analysis of Beginning Teachers', Mentors', and Principals' Perceptions of the Blum Mentoring Program. Patricia Scully was her doctoral advisor.

== Career ==
From 1998 to 2005, Cornish was an instructor in Goucher College's education department. She became an assistant professor in 2005. Cornish was the first African-American alumna at Goucher to be awarded tenure and the first African American to serve as chair of the faculty and associate provost for undergraduate students.

Cornish joined Ithaca College as provost and senior vice president for academic affairs in 2018. She was appointed to provost and executive vice president. Cornish became the interim president on August 30, 2021, following Shirley Collado's resignation. She was named as the 10th president by the board of trustees on March 7, 2022.

== Personal life ==
Cornish was married to Wayne Cornish. They have a son. In 2005, Cornish resided in Aberdeen, Maryland. She is married to school administrator Deborah Ptak.

Preceded by Shirley M. Collado	President of Ithaca College; 2021–present	Succeeded by
