= The Lever =

American investigative news outlet

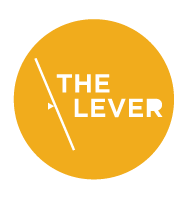
- Website type: News website
- Available in: English
- Predecessor: The Daily Poster
- Creator: David Sirota
- Editors: David Sirota; Joel Warner
- Website: www.levernews.com
- Commercial: No
- Launched: April 2020

The Lever is an American reader-supported investigative news outlet founded by David Sirota, a former speechwriter and senior adviser for the Bernie Sanders 2020 presidential campaign. The name The Lever is inspired by the Greek mathematician Archimedes, who said, "Give me a lever long enough and a fulcrum on which to place it, and I shall move the world."

As of June 2026, The Lever had 260,000 free subscribers and an undisclosed number of paid subscribers. Its mission, according to Sirota, is to "hold power accountable". According to managing editor Joel Warner, The Lever's "bread-and-butter" reporting and "core area of success" is reporting on "how corporate power is making everything worse for the rest of us".

Investigative reporting by The Lever has been cited by news outlets including The New York Times, NPR, The Washington Post, Politico, Al Jazeera, Rolling Stone, and The Baltimore Sun.

== History and organization ==
Founder David Sirota launched an earlier version, called The Daily Poster, in April 2020. In May 2021, The Daily Poster moved from a newsletter to an independent website. In March 2022, the site was expanded and renamed The Lever.

In 2023, The Lever's website received almost two million visits, and its reporting was seen more than 14 million times through platforms like Apple News and Google News.

As of April 2024, The Lever had more than 112,000 active free and paying subscribers, and a staff of 19.

As of June 2026, The Lever had 260,000 free subscribers and an undisclosed number of paid subscribers. The Lever intends to increase its staff to 21 members.

== Notable reporting ==
After the February 2023 train derailment in East Palestine, Ohio, The Lever reported on the "railroad industry's history of fighting stricter safety regulations". Based on this reporting, reporters from The Lever were interviewed on Democracy Now!, On The Media, The Problem with Jon Stewart, and other news outlets.

After the March 2023 collapse of Silicon Valley Bank, The Lever broke the story that the bank's president had lobbied for less regulatory scrutiny. The Lever's story, "SVB Chief Pressed Lawmakers to Weaken Bank Risk Regs", was cited by The New York Times the day after it was published.

Journalist David Cay Johnston praised The Lever's reporting on corrupt practices at The Boeing Company after a January 2024 incident when a door panel blew out mid-flight on Alaska Airlines Flight 1282. According to The Lever's reporting cited by Johnston, the root cause of the incident (and other safety problems with Boeing aircraft) "is the corrosive effects of stock buybacks and government subsidies, elevating executive and corporate director greed above aviation safety". Johnston wrote:

The Lever's coverage [of this story] should prompt significant safety and financial reforms. Its reporting on this story is worthy of the top honor in American journalism, the Pulitzer Gold Medal for public service.

After the April 2024 collapse of the Francis Scott Key Bridge in Baltimore, The Lever reported that "eight months prior, the Labor Department sanctioned the cargo giant [Maersk] for taking action against a sailor who previously reported unsafe working conditions while aboard a Maersk-operated boat." This reporting was cited by Rolling Stone and The Washington Post.

The Lever's related reporting on Maryland governor Larry Hogan, who (according to The Lever) touted megaships and ignored safety warnings before the Key Bridge disaster, was spotlighted on NPR's Morning Edition and cited by The New York Times Dealbook.

== Awards ==
In March 2023, The Lever received an Izzy Award from the Park Center for Independent Media "for outstanding achievement in independent media." The award was for "Inside The Right's Historic Billion-Dollar Dark Money Transfer", a four-part series published in August 2022 by Andrew Perez of The Lever in partnership with ProPublica.

In March 2024, The Lever received an Honorable Mention in the category "Breaking News-Small Division" in the "2023 Best in Business Awards" from the Society for Advancing Business Editing and Writing.

In November 2024, The Lever's investigative podcast series Master Plan won two Signal Awards for Best Writing and Best News & Politics Series. In May 2025, the podcast series also won the 2025 National Press Club Award, part of the New York Festival Radio Awards.

In September 2025, The Lever story "Meet the New Kingpin", by Amos Barshad, was selected to appear in The Year’s Best Sports Writing 2025, a published anthology of the year's top sports journalism.

In October 2025, Lois Parshley, a former The Lever reporter, won the top prize in the local/regional category of the National Academies of Sciences, Engineering, and Medicine's Eric and Wendy Schmidt Awards for Excellence in Science Communications.

== See also ==
- More Perfect Union (media organization)
