= Peter McGraw =

American behavioral scientist

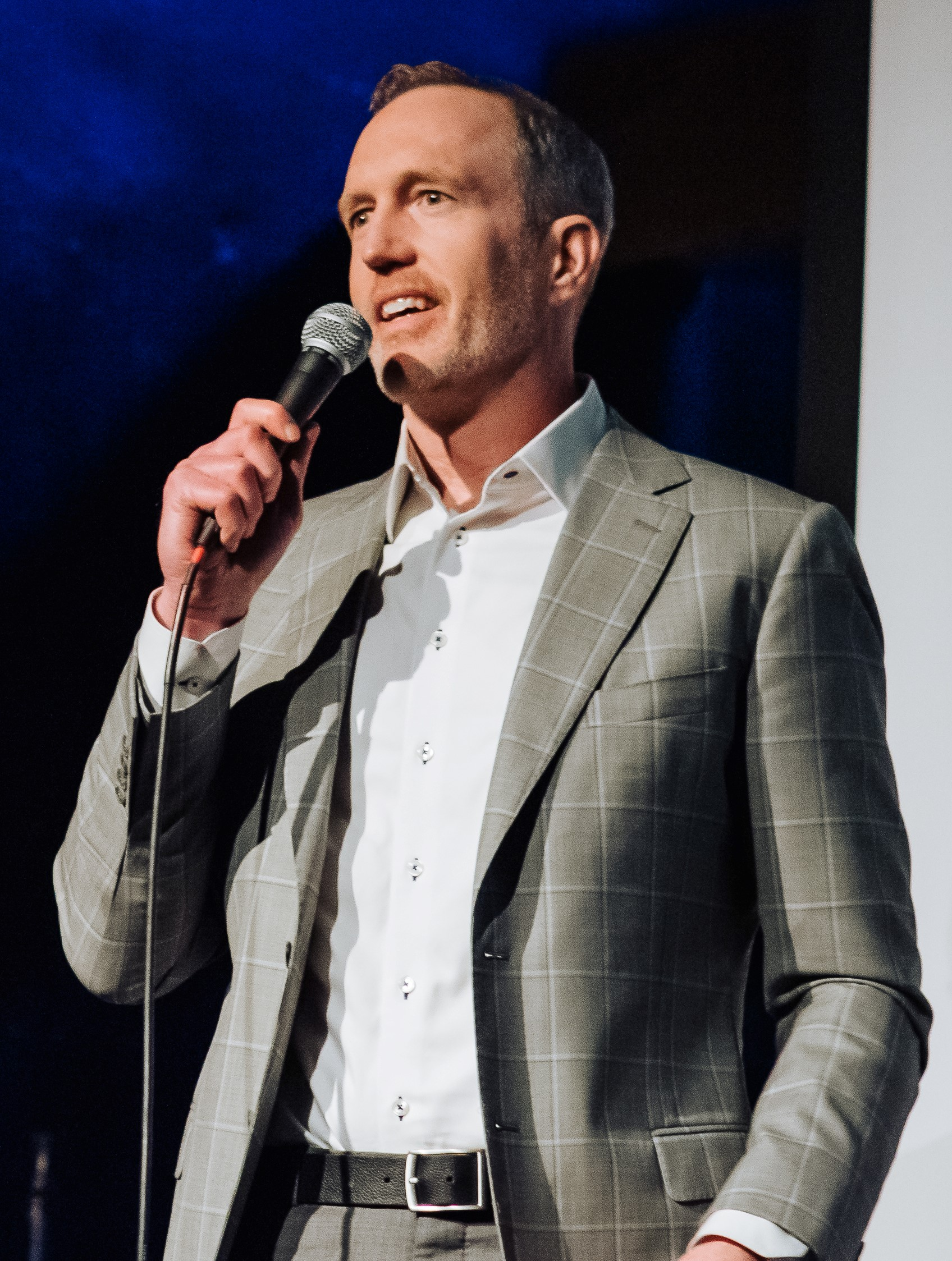

Peter McGraw is an American professor of marketing and psychology at the University of Colorado Boulder. As a behavioral scientist his research spans the fields of judgment and decision making, emotion, affect, mood, and behavioral economics.

McGraw's early work examined the interplay of judgment, emotion, and choice, with an emphasis on moral judgment, mixed emotions, and behavioral economics.

McGraw has examined the antecedents and consequences of humor. With Caleb Warren, he developed a theory of humor: the Benign Violation Theory. The theory suggests that humor occurs when a person simultaneously appraises a situation as wrong or threatening in some way (i.e., a violation) and yet appraises the situation to be okay or acceptable in some way (i.e., benign). His TEDx talk, "What makes things funny?" documents early insights from the benign violation theory.

In 2014, McGraw co-authored The Humor Code, a book about the science of humor and his travels around the world with journalist Joel Warner. In 2015, McGraw created a live comedy game show—"Funny or True?"—which pits scientists against comedians to see who has the best blend of brains and funny bone. In 2018, McGraw launched a podcast "I'm not joking" that looks at the lives of comedians, improvisers, comedy writers, and other funny people from business, science, and the arts. In 2020, McGraw published his second book, Shtick to Business: What the Masters of Comedy can Teach You about Breaking Rules, Being Fearless, and Building a Serious Career.

== Academic career ==
McGraw received his Ph.D. from The Ohio State University in 2002, and subsequently completed a postdoctoral fellowship at Princeton University with Daniel Kahneman. In 2004, he joined the faculty at the Leeds School of Business, University of Colorado Boulder. In 2008, he received an appointment (courtesy) in the Department of Psychology and Neuroscience. At the University of Colorado's Leeds School of Business, he teaches courses in marketing management and behavioral economics. He also teaches for executive MBA programs at London Business School and the Rady School of Management at UC San Diego. He directs the Humor Research Lab (HuRL) and co-directs a virtual research lab, the Moral Research Lab (MoRL) with Daniel Bartels.

In 2007, McGraw was named a Marketing Science Institute Young Scholar.

Outside academic pursuits, McGraw, from 2004 to 2010, served as academic coordinator, assistant coach, and associate head coach of the men's lacrosse team at the University of Colorado. He was the head coach of the men's lacrosse club at Princeton University from 2002 to 2004.

== The Humor Code ==
In 2011, McGraw and Joel Warner created "The Humor Code Project," a two-year, 91,000-mile global search for what makes things funny. Their travels took them to Tanzania, Scandinavia, Japan, Palestine, Peru, and several other destinations in North America. McGraw and Warner authored The Humor Code, a book about their travels and the experiments they conducted along the way. The two maintained multiple blogs about their adventures on Wired, Huffington Post, and Psychology Today. McGraw's research and the book have been widely covered by the media, including the Wall Street Journal, NPR, MSNBC, The Boston Globe, Scientific American, The Atlantic, Denver Post, and others.

== The funniest cities in the United States ==
McGraw and his Humor Code co-author Joel Warner worked with Adrian Ward and Caleb Warren, and other members of the Humor Research Lab to create the Humor Algorithm, which ranked the 50 funniest cities in America. The team collected data for the project:

- Frequency of visits to Cheeseburger comedy websites, such as Lolcats and FAIL Blog
- Number of comedy clubs per square mile in each city
- Traveling comedians’ ratings of each city's comedy-club audiences
- Number of famous comedians born in each city, divided by city population
- Number of famous funny tweeters living in each city, divided by city population
- Number of comedy radio stations available in each city
- Frequency of humor-related web searches originating in each city

The team also conducted an extensive survey with more than 900 residents from the top ten cities determined by the objective measures above. To glean a deeper understanding of humorous daily life in these cities, researchers asked residents about the entertainment they enjoyed, asked whether they looked for humor in their friends and lovers, and subjected them to a “Need for Levity” personality test. Chicago was deemed the funniest city in the United States.

== Solo-The Single Persons’ Guide to a Remarkable Life ==
In December 2019, McGraw launched his second podcast called "Solo-The Single Person’s Guide to a Remarkable Life". The podcast takes a positive view of single living. He interviews singles living remarkable lives and experts who provide advice to listeners. Notable guests include Kristin Newman, Neal Brennan, and Alonzo Bodden.

== Selected publications ==
- Bartels, D. M., Bauman, C.W., Cushman, F.A., Pizarro, D.A., & McGraw, A.P., (Forthcoming), Moral judgment and decision making. In G. Keren & G. Wu (Eds.) The Wiley Blackwell Handbook of Judgment and Decision Making. Chichester, UK: Wiley.
- McGraw, A.P. & Warren, C. (2014). Benign violation theory. In S. Attardo (Ed.). Encyclopedia of Humor Studies, Vol. 1 (pp. 75–77) Sage Publications.
- McGraw, A.P., Williams, L.T., & Warren, C. (2014). The rise and fall of humor: Psychological distance modulates humorous responses to tragedy. Social Psychology and Personality Science5, 566–572.
- McGraw, A.P., Warren, C., Williams, L., & Leonard, B., (2012). Too close for comfort, or too far to care? Finding humor in distant tragedies and close mishaps. Psychological Science, 25, 1215 - 1223.
- McGraw, A.P., Schwartz, J. & Tetlock, P. (2012). From the commercial to the communal: Reframing taboo trade-offs in religious and pharmaceutical marketing. Journal of Consumer Research, 39, 157–173.
- Larsen, J.T. & McGraw, A.P. (2011). Further evidence for mixed emotions. Journal of Personality and Social Psychology, 100, 1095–1110.
- McGraw, A.P., Todorov, A., & Kunreuther, H. (2011). A policy maker's dilemma: Preventing blame or preventing terrorism. Organizational Behavior and Human Decision Processes, 115, 25–34.
- McGraw, A.P., Larsen, J.T., Kahneman, D., & Schkade, D. (2010). Comparing gains and losses. Psychological Science, 21, 1438–1445.
- McGraw, A.P., Shafir, E., & Todorov, A. (2010). Valuing money and things: Why a $20 item can be worth more and less than $20. Management Science, 56, 816–830.
- McGraw, A.P. & Warren, C. (2010). Benign violations: Making immoral behavior funny. Psychological Science, 21, 1141–1149.
- Levav, J., & McGraw, A.P. (2009). Emotional accounting: How feelings about money influence consumer choice. Journal of Marketing Research, 46, 66–80.
- McGraw, A.P., Mellers, B.A, & Tetlock, P.E. (2005). Expectations and emotions of Olympic athletes. Journal of Experimental Social Psychology, 41, 438–446.
- McGraw, A.P., & Tetlock, P.E. (2005). Taboo trade-offs, relational framing and the acceptability of exchanges. Journal of Consumer Psychology, 15, 2-15
- Larsen, J.T., McGraw, A.P., Mellers, B.A. & Cacioppo, J. (2004). The agony of victory and thrill of defeat: Mixed emotional reactions to disappointing wins and relieving losses. Psychological Science, 15, 325–330.
- McGraw, A.P., Tetlock, P.E., & Kristel, O.V. (2003). The limits of fungibility: Relational schemata and the value of things. Journal of Consumer Research, 30, 219–229.
- Larsen, J.T., McGraw, A.P., & Cacioppo, J. (2001). Can people feel happy and sad at the same time? Journal of Personality and Social Psychology, 81, 684–696.

== See also ==
- Theories of Humor
- Loss Aversion
- Mental Accounting
