= IC Voicestream =

American collegiate a cappella group

Background information
- Origin: Ithaca College, Ithaca, New York, United States
- Genres: Collegiate a cappella Rock; Contemporary pop
- Years active: 2002–present
- Members: Grace Commisso '27; Casey Ellison '27; Isiah Owens '28; Jack Delman '28; Christian Laughlin '28; Lauren Ravas '28; Anita Chip '28; Ryan Corrigan '28; Gus Fowler '29; Kaiden Reitz '29; Tommy Anzuini '29; Katie Lehmann '29; Will Lesser '29; Scarlette Eggleston '30; Charlotte Johansen '30; Lydia Hibbert '30

IC Voicestream is one of the six officially recognized a cappella groups at Ithaca College. Founded in 2002 by Simon Baumer, Paul Canetti, Marissa De Vito, and Jessica Kupiec, the group is known as the college's premier a cappella group. The group performs strictly contemporary pop and rock songs.

== History ==
IC Voicestream was founded in 2002 by Simon Baumer, Paul Canetti, Marissa De Vito, and Jessica Kupiec after Canetti joined another a cappella group on campus, the all-male Ithacappella, but left and formed IC Voicestream with Kupiec, De Vito, and Baumer to break the boundaries of typical a cappella groups, focusing more on rock music, but overtime also adapting contemporary pop. The group later rose to popularity, becoming the most popular a cappella group on campus.

Over time, their success led them to branch out into competitive a cappella, with their first major competition occurring in the 2010s. In 2014, IC Voicestream made a significant mark in their career by placing second in the International Championship of Collegiate A Cappella quarterfinals for the first time.

== In popular culture ==
IC Voicestream gained recognition from American media personality Trisha Paytas after Ted Nivison, a well-known YouTuber and comedian, discussed his experience as a former member during a conversation on her podcast Just Trish.

== Releases ==
IC Voicestream (2005)

1. Papercut
2. Bring Me To Life
3. Love Song for No One
4. Counting Blue Cars
5. Are You Happy Now?
6. Perfect Drug
7. 2+2=5
8. Pig
9. Faint
10. Stuck
11. Everlong
12. Losing Grip
13. Chop Suey!
14. Uninvited

Acapocalypse (2009)

1. Emergency
2. Amsterdam
3. Fidelity
4. Breath
5. Limp
6. Chicago
7. The First Single
8. Out of the Woods
9. Portions for Foxes
10. Suspension
11. Call Me When You're Sober
12. Tonight, Tonight

Hit The Beat (2012)

1. Mercy
2. Careful
3. Settle Down
4. Set Fire to the Rain
5. Never Forget You
6. Little Lion Man
7. Careful
8. Make You Feel My Love
9. Viva La Vida
10. 16 Military Wives

Toxic (2019)

1. Toxic
2. Guys My Age
3. Come Round Soon - Live

Infatuated (2023)

1. Locked Out of Heaven
2. How Do You Sleep?
3. Love on the Brain
4. Commit Me
