= Peggy R. Williams =

Peggy Ryan Williams was the president of Ithaca College from 1997 until 2008. Williams assumed the presidency of Ithaca College on July 1, 1997. She is the college's seventh president and its first female president. Williams came to Ithaca from Lyndon State College, where she had been president since 1989. A native of Montreal, Williams has lived in the United States since 1968 and is a citizen of both the United States and Canada.

Dr. Williams received her B.A. degree in psychology from the St. Michael's College, University of Toronto and her M.Ed. degree from the University of Vermont. She earned her Ed.D. degree at Harvard University.

Preceded by James J. Whalen	President of Ithaca College; 1997–2008	Succeeded by Thomas Rochon
