= Jim Naureckas =

Jim Naureckas (born 1964 in Libertyville, Illinois) is the editor of Extra!, the magazine of FAIR (Fairness and Accuracy in Reporting).

He graduated from Stanford University in 1985 with a bachelor's degree in political science. He covered the Iran-Contra scandal for the magazine In These Times, and was managing editor of the Council on Hemispheric Affairs' newsletter.

Naureckas became the editor of Extra! in 1990. He is the co-author of The Way Things Aren't: Rush Limbaugh's Reign of Error (The New Press). He co-edited The FAIR Reader: An Extra! Review of Press and Politics in the '90s (Westview Press). He is editor of the New York City fan site NYSonglines.com.

In 1997, he married Janine Jackson, the program director of FAIR.
