= Joel Warner =

American writer

- Citizenship: United States
- Education: Haverford College
- Occupations: Author and Journalist
- Writing career
- Notable work: The Humor Code
- Notable awards: James Beard Foundation Journalism Awards, Best American Sports Writing anthology, Casey Medals for Meritorious Journalism, Dart Awards for Excellence in Coverage of Trauma, the Magazine Awards of Western Publishing and the National Awards for Education Reporting

Joel Warner is an American author and journalist. He is the managing editor of The Lever investigative news outlet, and formerly worked as a staff writer for International Business Times and Westword. He has also written for Esquire, Wired, Men's Health, Men's Journal, Bloomberg Businessweek, The Boston Globe, Slate, Grantland, and other publications. He is co-author of The Humor Code: A Global Search For What Makes Things Funny, and the forthcoming The Curse of the Marquis: A Notorious Scoundrel, A Mythical Manuscript, And The Biggest Scandal In Literary History.

== The Humor Code ==
In 2010, Warner met Peter McGraw, a professor at the University of Colorado. Warner was fascinated by McGraw's research and unified theory of humor, the Benign Violation Theory. Starting in 2011, the two created "The Humor Code Project," a two-year, 91,000-mile global search for what makes things funny. Their travels took them to Tanzania, Scandinavia, Japan, Israel, Peru, and several other destinations in North America. McGraw and Warner authored The Humor Code, a book about their travels and the experiments they conducted along the way. The two maintained multiple blogs about their adventures on Wired, Huffington Post, and Psychology Today.

== Works ==
As a staff writer for International Business Times, Warner received a Society of American Business Editors and Writers' Best in Business award for his article "Marijuana Inc" (published December 1, 2015).

As a staff writer for Westword, Warner received several awards for his feature writing:

"Black and Blue" (published January 20, 2011)

- 2012 Salute to Excellence Awards, National Association of Black Journalists

"Martial Law" (published February 4, 2010')

- 2011 Mental Health America Media Award
- 2011 AAN AltWeekly Award

"The Boy Who Wouldn't Tell" (published April 22, 2010)

- 2011 - Prevention for a Safer Society Award, National Council on Crime and Delinquency

"Lax and the City" (published May 27, 2010)

- 2011 Education Reporting Award, National Education Writers Association
- 2011 Salute to Excellence Award, National Association of Black Journalists
- 2011 Best of the West, First Amendment Funding, Inc.

"Trial by Fire" (published July 22, 2010)

- 2011 Salute to Excellence Award, National Association of Black Journalists

"Taken for a Ride" (published December 2, 2010)

- 2011 Salute to Excellence Awards, National Association of Black Journalists

"Growth Industry" (published February 5, 2009)

- 2010 Maggie Award, The Magazine Awards of Western Publishing

"Cash Crop" (published September 10, 2009)

- 2010 Maggie Award, The Magazine Awards of Western Publishing,

"The Good Soldier" (published March 20, 2008)

- 2009 AAN AltWeekly Award
- 2009 Society of Professional Journalists, Colorado Chapter

"Father of Invention" (published July 10, 2008) 2009 AAN AltWeekly Award

"You Do the Meth" (published June 28, 2007)

- 2008 Dart Award for Excellence in Coverage of Trauma
- 2008 Casey Medal for Meritorious Journalism

"Mr. Big" (published November 3, 2005)

- 2006 James Beard Journalism Award, The James Beard Foundation
- 2006 Bert Greene Award, International Association of Culinary Professionals
