= Fairness & Accuracy in Reporting =

Media critique group in New York City

- Formation: 1986; 40 years ago
- Founder: Jeff Cohen, Martin A. Lee
- Type: 501(c)(3) organization
- Tax ID no.: 13-3392362
- Purpose: Media criticism
- Products: Extra! magazine, CounterSpin radio program
- Key people: Janine Jackson, Jim Naureckas
- Website: fair.org

Fairness & Accuracy In Reporting (FAIR) is a progressive media critique organization based in New York City. The organization was founded in 1986 by Jeff Cohen and Martin A. Lee. FAIR monitors American news media for bias, inaccuracies and censorship, and advocates for more diversity of perspectives in the news media. FAIR describes itself as "the national media watch group". FAIR publishes Extra!, a magazine of media criticism, and also produces the radio program CounterSpin, which features interviews with journalists, scholars, and activists on current media-related news stories.

== Journalistic philosophy ==
FAIR describes itself on its website as "the national media watch group" and defines its mission as working to "invigorate the First Amendment by advocating for greater diversity in the press and by scrutinizing media practices that marginalize public interest, minority and dissenting viewpoints." FAIR refers to itself as a "progressive group that believes that structural reform is ultimately needed to break up the dominant media conglomerates, establish independent public broadcasting and promote strong nonprofit sources of information."

Commentators on FAIR's syndicated radio program, CounterSpin, have frequently argued that American media is biased in favor of conservatism. Professor of public policy Terry J. Buss has argued that FAIR combines media criticism and partisan advocacy for progressive causes, and that their criticism of conservative groups is done "more on ideological grounds than on substance".

FAIR believes that corporate sponsorship and ownership, as well as government policies and pressure, restricts journalism and therefore distorts public discourse. FAIR also believes that most news media reflects the interests of business and government elites while ignoring or minimizing minority, female, public interest, and dissenting points of view. FAIR criticizes media outlets for engaging in false balance in order to not be accused of taking sides on controversial topics.

== See also ==
- Accuracy in Media
- Columbia Journalism Review
- Institute for Public Accuracy
- Media bias
- Media Lens
- Media Matters for America
- Media Research Center
- Norman Solomon
