= Cathy Lee Crane =

American film director

- Born: November 12, 1962 (age 63)
- Occupations: Filmmaker; educator

Cathy Lee Crane (born 1962) is a North American experimental films director and producer, based in Ithaca, New York. She was a Guggenheim Fellow in 2013. Crane is professor of media arts, sciences, and studies at Ithaca College.

Her films include Pasolini's Last Words, focusing on the death and legacy of filmmaker Pier Paolo Pasolini.

== Filmography ==
=== Feature films ===
- Crossing Columbus (2020)
- The Manhattan Front (2017)
- Pasolini's Last Words (2012)

=== Short films ===
- Border Dwellers (2025)
- Terrestrial Sea (2022)
- On the Line (2010)
- Adrift (2009)
- The Girl from Marseilles (2000)
- Sketches After Halle (1998)
- Not for Nothin’ (1996)
- White City (1994)

== Awards ==
- 1997 Eastman Kodak Award as Most Promising Talents of the Future Generation of Filmmakers
- 2013 Guggenheim Fellowship in Film-Video
