= Radical media =

Journalistic media that disperse action-oriented political agendas

Radical media are communication outlets that disperse action-oriented political agendas utilizing existing communication infrastructures and their supportive users. These types of media are differentiated from conventional mass communications through its progressive content, reformist culture, and democratic process of production and distribution. Advocates support its alternative and oppositional view of mass media, arguing that conventional outlets are politically biased through their production and distribution. However, there are some critics that exist in terms of validating the authenticity of the content, its political ideology, long-term perishability, and the social actions led by the media.

The term "radical media" was introduced by John D. H. Downing in his 1984 study of rebellious communication and social movements emphasizing alternative media's political and goal-oriented activism. Radical media manifests new social movements' individualistic, and humanistic socio-political model of disintermediation. While the coverage of this term coincides with other branches of alternative media, namely tactical and activist media, it differs from conventional mass media in terms of its ideological and behavioural practices, making radical media significant in terms of its amplification of social movements. Downing describes Radical Media as being "generally small-scale and in many different forms, that express an alternative vision to hegemonic policies, and perspectives." Hence, the term categorizes various forms of alternative media that are progressive, reformist and post-materialistic. Some media that are categorized by radical media include, but are not restricted to, community media, student media, tactical media, subcultural media, social movement media, citizen media, and alternative journalism. Groups that fall under radical media emphasize egalitarian channels characterized by inclusive, action-driven, prefigurative, and marginal practices that challenge conventional media.

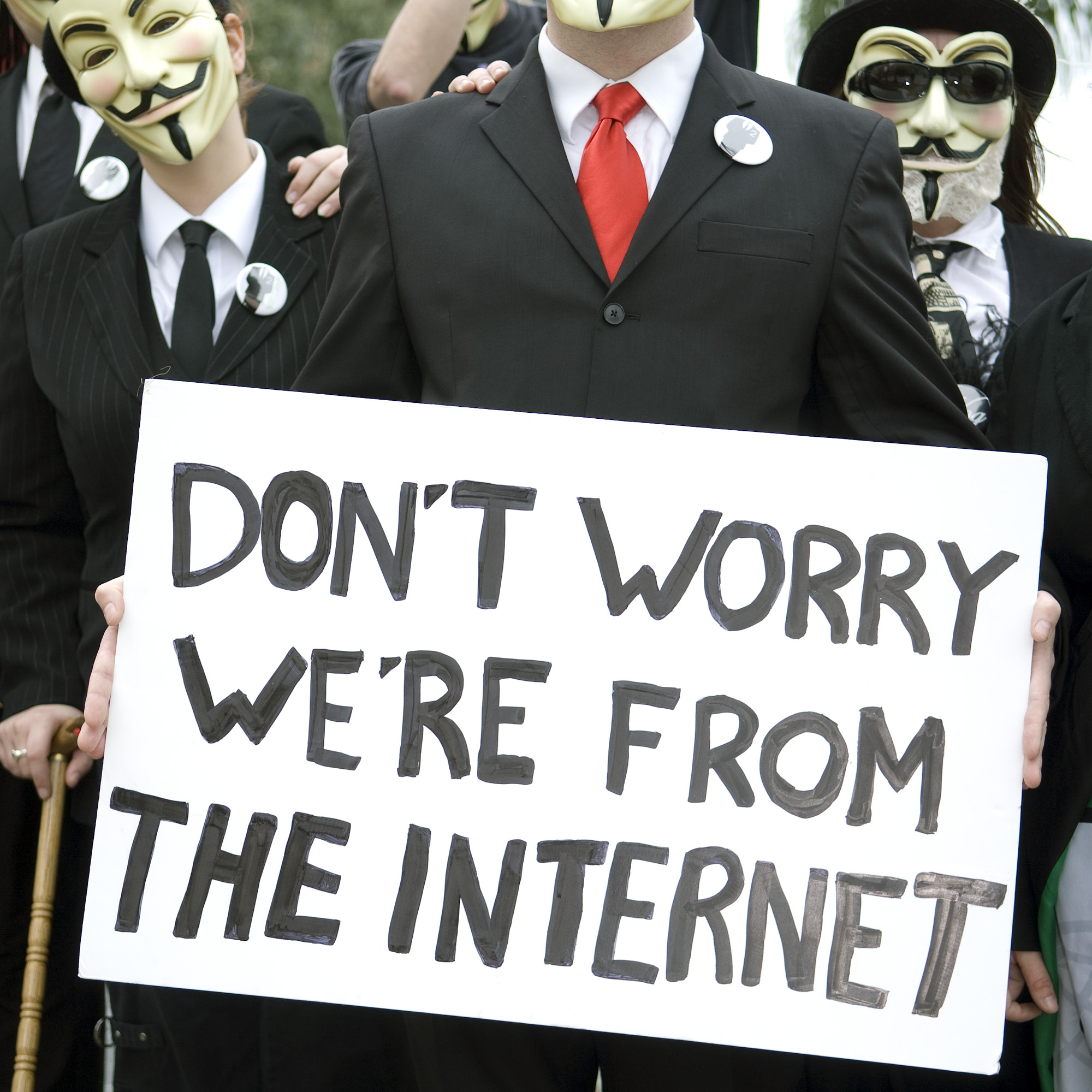
A 2010 protests as a part of Project Chanology.

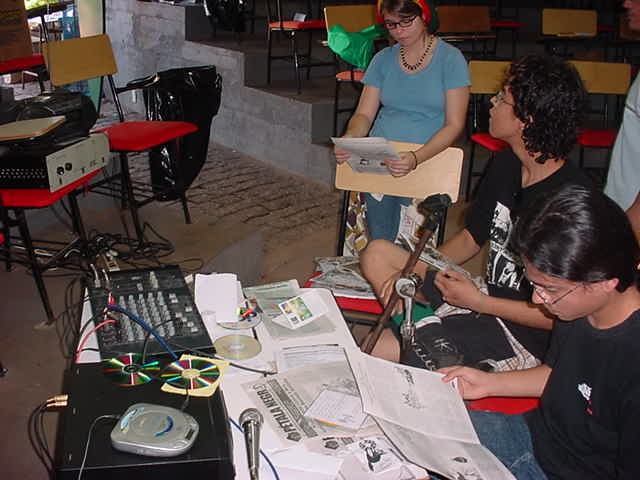
Indymedia collective at Mato Grosso Federal University in Cuiabá, Brazil hosting a free radio broadcast in 2004.

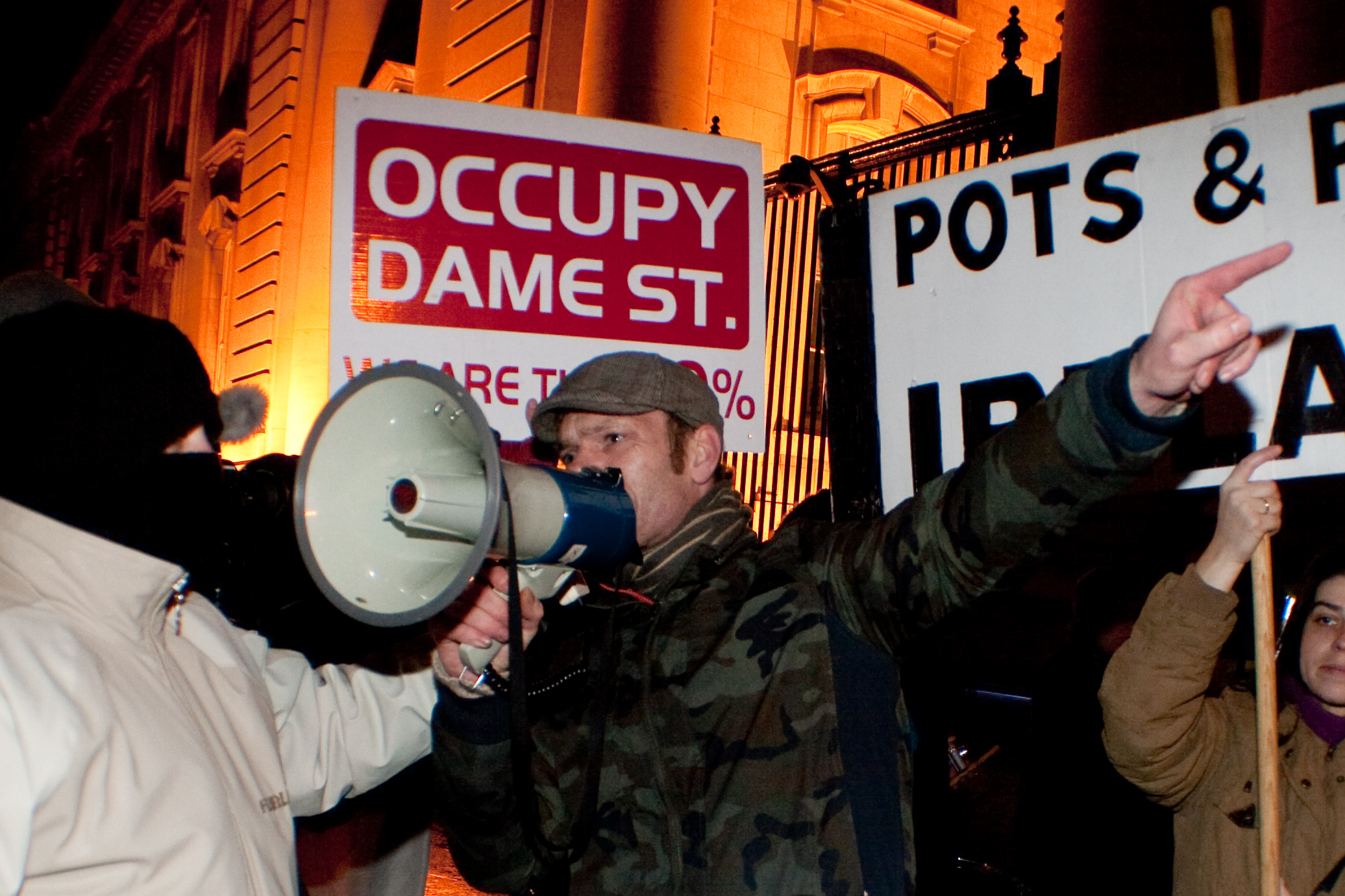
Occupy the Dáil - We are the 99 per cent. Protesters outside the Oireachtas in Dublin, Republic of Ireland.

== Prefigurative media ==
One way of investigating radical alternative media is through ‘active citizenship.’ Downing argues that its collective ownership, goals, and participation empower the media's political stance. While mass media lessens wider participation due to costly production, radical media provides a more democratic means of two-way communication. Rodriguez’ phrase—“citizens’ media” further explains the development of empowered citizens through self-motivated participation. In her model, like Indymedia, collective participation through the reconstruction of media-ecology empowers “citizenship” and the community. In this discourse, political cognition occurs naturally through self-education.

This non-hierarchical and self-reliant development of political consciousness exemplifies its anarchistic values, which in turn frees collective creation and “rebellious expression” leading to a more democratic means of communication when compared with mass media. Like Downing, most who focus on its participatory discourse link disintermediation to “direct democracy." Radical self-reliant meaning-making will transform the representational politics’ distance from conventional powers.

However, neutral democratic mediation is arguably impossible: When examining the political significance, Lievrouw explores collisions between ‘Collaborative Behavioral’ theory viewing popular-driven social movements as “irrational and contagious behaviour,” and the ‘Resource Mobilization’ theory describing radical alternative media as socially rational and “communal goal driven."

To address these contrasting arguments it is crucial to examine how these media develop ideologically and circulate. Radical alternative media manifests by New Social Movements’ individualistic, and humanistic socio-political model of disintermediation. In politics, collaborative journalism investigation enforces a “permanent campaign” that transforms audiences to investigative “citizen-jurors." Downing explains the discourse with a “prefigurative politic” where media expression reflects their socio-political practice— “Committed speech."

== Modes ==
=== Participatory radio ===
Participatory community radio has been employed by radical media groups for easier access and participation by the wider public and to broadcast their alternative voices in one of the most traditional mass media. Similar to community access television, this mode of media serves geographically oriented communities and their localized interests. However, radio often attracts smaller or newer radical media groups than television, as the entrance barrier is a lot lower. Accessibility of the Internet also allows them to set up their broadcast more easily and broadens locality by serving a more global audience.

=== Community access television ===
Television as a means of communication has a significant role in effectively disseminating messages to a wide audiences. While many television broadcasts are privately owned and operated, governments around the world have legislated to foster democratized public-access television for non-commercial, alternative, and community oriented content productions.

- Public access television
- Dublin Community Television
- Cork Community TV
- Community television
- Community Television Interactive

=== Online media ===
With the diffusion of Internet access and affordable technologies, radical media has grown rapidly in the past decade. The democratic and instantaneous nature of the Internet, particularly Web 2.0, encouraged denaturalization of the conventional media ecology that used to be driven by media conglomerates, while allowing independent media producers to connect with the public as widely as their contestants.

The Internet allows for much faster and wider communication between media producers and their audience. The nature of this mode urges the appearance of an alternative and radical media ecology that reforms previously monopolized public media. This politically “pre-figurative” and action oriented participatory media activity on the Internet is evident in the revolutionary wave of civil riots in the Arab Spring. During the protests, social media was effectively used to communicate, organize, and stay connected with one another to stand against government repressions.

Online media also works as a great advantage to radical media groups for their financial, organizational, and community sustainability as it allows for broader access to lobbyists, members, and individuals.

=== Other cultural modes ===
Radical media is, however, not limited in technological means of communication. Downing argues that “the full spectrum of radical media in modern cultures includes a huge gamut of activities, from street theatre and murals to dance and song.” While audiences in conventional modes of media are perhaps more personalized, or domesticated, radical media often take form in cultural activisms in a public sphere, fostering a more active and independent audience.

- CrowdVoice
- InSTEDD iLab América

== Graphics and visual rhetoric ==
Radical media contents rely largely on graphic design and artistic visual communication mechanisms that were used in 1960s underground publications, like, The Whole Earth Catalog, Black Panther Party Paper, and Oz. While there are a number of political art movements that were employed by radical media, many art historians and cultural analysts associate their artistic styles largely with expressionism, dadaism, surrealism, and the situationists détournement—culture jamming.

The political agenda that the media hold is often seen to be rooted in the early 20th century anarchistic political art movement, Dadaism, which rejects logical reasoning, forces irrationality and intuition. While the early social movements focused on anti-war politics, the use of Dadaism in radical media is extended in order to critically illustrate opposing ideas of corporatism, institutionalism, and regulations. To criticize the mainstream culture and politics, radical media employs situationist detournement that remixes and alters the existing mainstream media contents such as political campaign, commercial entertainment, and popular culture.

== Criticism ==
While this idealized view may interpret radical media as sole utopian liberators, a bottom-up reversed hierarchy exists which excludes some—reflective to conventional media. In addition, dependency on existing power structures is inevitable, as the technological production (i.e. hosting servers) is “within the walls of mainstreams” through hosting servers and when reaching out to wider audiences. Further, radical media mainly take place in wealthy regions as the access is granted through possession of sudden info-communication technologies which are ‘taken-for-granted.’ Likewise, the physicality of facilitating extensive reciprocal communication and the limitation of accessing institutional information due to political stance can be other obstacles to radical media.

"Perishability", on the other hand, is a persistent issue raised by both proponents and dissenters. "Cultural contexts and meanings" change rapidly, accommodating the democratic needs and movement the public is demanding. Although the Internet has significantly contributed, independence of "idea circulation" is not guaranteed, as it lacks "reliable" sources of funding and technologies.

Silverstone underlines the need to "understand how meanings emerge" in media and their interference through mediation. Along with the problems mentioned above, we tend to overlook the contextual reliability issues when focusing on its political significance.

Downing argues that radical media are politically "prefigurative," openly displaying ideologies in a "populist manner" as an "activist tool." Thus, reliability is compromised by a subjective interpretation of 'ordinary.' Atton and Couldry explore the matter in comparison to its counterpart. While mass media establishes symbolic powers based on professionalism and its receptive-spectatorship, radical alternative media's reliability comes from audience's active engagement, ‘participatory-editorship,’ where audiences take part in shaping the story through interaction with the authors.

== See also ==
Read more

- Alternative media
- Alternative media (U.S. political left)
- Alternative media (U.S. political right)
- Citizen journalism
- Citizen media
- Community radio
- Independent media
- Media activism
- Media democracy
- Media justice
- Mass media
- Open publishing
- Pirate radio
- Pirate television
- Tactical media

Radical media channels

- Democracy Now!
- Independent Media Center
- InfoWars
- List of independent television stations in the U.S.
- New Internationalist
- OhmyNews
- Project Chanology
- Positive News
- Community Media Association
- Independent World Television
- Independent Media Center

Related academics

- Chris Atton
- Rodney Benson
- John DH Downing
- Jean Burgess
