= Indigenous media =

Media

Indigenous media can reference film, video, music, digital art, and sound produced and created by and for indigenous people. It refers to the use of communication tools, pathways, and outlets by indigenous peoples for their own political and cultural purposes.

== Definition ==
Indigenous media is the use of modern media techniques by indigenous peoples, also called Fourth World peoples. Indigenous media helps communities in their fight against cultural extinction, economic and ecological decline, and forced displacement. Most often in the field of indigenous media, the creators of the media are also the consumers, together with the neighboring communities. Sometimes the media is also received by institutions and film festivals located far away from the production location, like the American Indian Film Festival. The production is usually locally based, low budget, and small scale, but it can also be sponsored by different support groups and governments. The concept of indigenous media could be extended to First World alternative media, like AIDS activist video.

Fourth Cinema explores issues that are associated with indigenous communities. Fourth Cinema takes the camera away from First Cinema, which is the camera that is associated with the gaze of the colonizer. The use of Fourth Cinema allows for the communities to rightly represent themselves, without the gaze of First Cinema. Which allows for better representation for Indigenous communities. Fourth Cinema incorporates the community that is being represented on screen, by incorporating the community in the production process. Behind the camera, or in front of the camera. However a film is not Fourth Cinema just because it has Indigenous characters, what makes it Fourth Cinema is that the representation is for the community by the community.

== History ==
The research of indigenous media and the international indigenous movement in the process of globalization develop in parallel. In the second half of the 20th century, United Nations agencies, including the United Nations Working Group on Indigenous Populations (WGIP), led the movement. The United Nations General Assembly adopted a declaration aimed at protecting the rights of indigenous peoples in 2007.

The theoretical development of indigenous media research first occurred in anthropology in 1980. It was accompanied by a critical research method that diverged from post-colonialism and post-structuralism. The newer method attempted to minimize the power imbalance between the researcher and the researched. Leading up to this, ethnographic films that gave photographic techniques to locals can be traced back as far as the Navajo Project in 1960. The project was the pioneering work of Sol Worth and John Adair, to which the origin of a new anthropological language and style of ethnography can be attributed.

However, the indigenous media movement was not a significant phenomenon for another decade. The widely recognized start of the new media movement was a collaboration between American anthropologist Eric Michaels and Australia's Warlpiri Aboriginal Broadcasting. This new type of collaborative anthropological project exemplified a change from a simple observation of the life of the indigenous people to a cultural record by the indigenous people themselves. Following the Warlpiri project, the Brazilian Kayapó village project of Vincent Carelli and Terence Turner, and the indigenous series by Māori producer Barry Barclay in New Zealand, have been important milestones in the development of indigenous media.

However, it was Faye Ginsburg, an American anthropologist, who laid the theoretical foundation for the study of indigenous media. Her research in 1991 expounded the Faustian dilemma between technology and tribal life and inspired later indigenous media researchers.

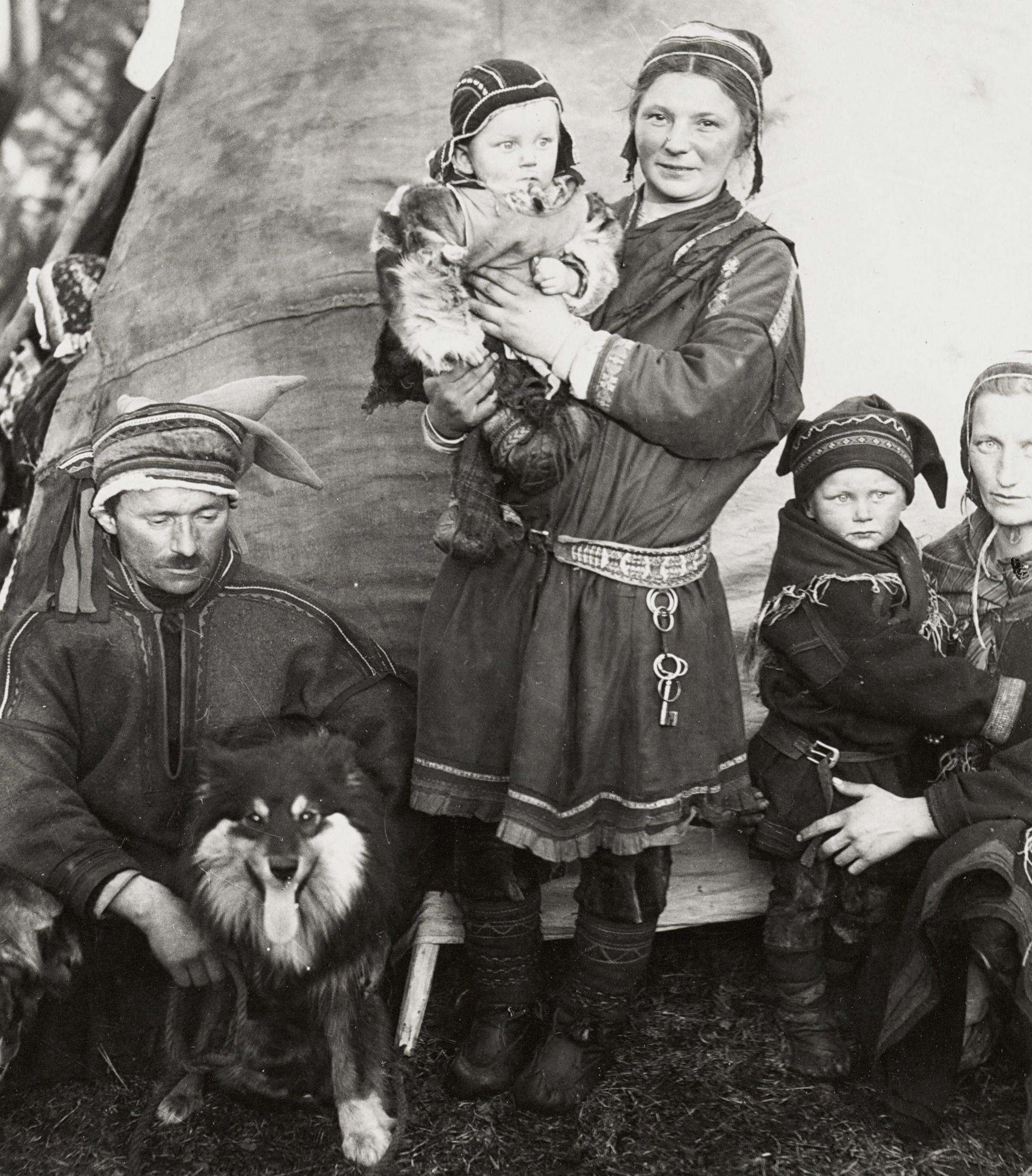
Sami family in Finland, 1936

The important theories of recent indigenous media studies have highlighted the dynamic relationship between local indigenous communities and their countries and globalization. Lorna Roth's research on the discourse rights of Canadian indigenous groups in 2005, Jennifer Deger's exploration of the media technology movement in the Australian Yolngu community in 2006, and Michael Robert Evans's ethnographic research on the Canadian Inuit community Igloolik in 2008, etc. are all development of high reference value since the 21st century. The idea that the media is a foreign power that affects the indigenous people is no longer accurate, now that indigenous people are working in media within all creative industries as an individual, collective or nationally which impacts the media as we know it.

== Theories and concepts ==
- Fourth cinema

It has origins in New Zealand, created by Barry Barclay, because he experienced that his films did not fit in to first, second or third cinema. The goal of fourth cinema is to give an accurate and dignified representation of an indigenous people, by having indigenous film-makers who will frame the indigenous people with an indigenous world-view.

- De-colonial literary theory
- Indigenous ontology

This theory involves several foundational concepts, such as: 1) expansive concepts of time, 2) interdependence with all matter on earth and in the universe and 3) multiple dimensions of reality.

- Aboriginal Theory

Aboriginal theory indicates a theory of acquiring knowledge through ethnographic methods, in which the stimulation of established goals and outputs, as well as the communication between the indigenous people and the environment in which they exist, is minimized.

- Indigenous Sociology
- Indigenous librarianship

Indigenous librarianship theoretically study how knowledge, concepts, and the organization, management and practice based on these concepts are shaped and integrated through the cultural customs, empirical conditions and political aspirations of indigenous societies or communities.

- Indigenous Epistemologies and Pedagogies
- Holism
- Indigenous Technological Sovereignty or Tecno-Sovereignty

== Notable people within indigenous media ==
- John Adair (1913–1997), American anthropologist, known for his 1972 book, Through Navajo Eyes: An Exploration in Film Communication and Anthropology, in collaboration with Sol Worth
- Barry Barclay
- Aloy Deb Barma, Indian visual anthropologist; academic, Mizoram University
- Corinn Columpar, Canadian academic; Director of the Cinema Studies Institute at University of Toronto; author, Unsettling Sights: The Fourth World on Film (2010)
- Daniel Fisher, Australian cultural anthropologist; academic, University of California, Berkeley; author, 2016 book, The Voice and Its Doubles: Media and Music in Northern Australia
- Faye Ginsburg
- Kevin Glynn, New Zealand media and cultural studies academic; known for analyses of media and cultural views of Māori activism, including that of Tame Iti
- John Hartley, British-Australian academic and researcher in cultural studies; anthropologist of media; researcher at Curtin University's Indigenous Culture and Digital Technologies program
- Kate Hennessy, Canadian anthropologist; video artist
- Zacharias Kunuk
- Mario Murillo
- Terence Turner(1935–2015), anthropologist and ethnographer; activist with Kayapo community from central Brazil
- Richard Wilson, Canadian and Hwlitsum First Nation artist
- Sol Worth (1922 – 1977), American painter; scholar of visual communication and visual anthropology; co-author with John Adair
- Sterlin Harjo
- Taika Waititi

== Examples of indigenous media ==
- Atanarjuat: The Fast Runner
- Different Lenses
- Four Sheets to the Wind
- Kanehsatake: 270 Years of Resistance
- The Journals of Knud Rasmussen
- Boy
- Reservation Dogs

== See also ==
- Alternative media
- Ethnographic film
- Post-colonialism
- Post-structuralism
- American Indian Film Festival
- Indigenous peoples
