= Clemencia Rodriguez =

Colombian media and communication scholar

Clemencia Rodríguez
- Born: Colombia
- Citizenship: Colombian American
- Education: Telecommunications
- Alma mater: Pontifical Xavierian University (B.A.); Ohio University (M.A., Ph.D)
- Occupations: Researcher, professor
- Employer: Temple University
- Known for: Coining the term "citizen media"

Clemencia Rodriguez is a Colombian US-based media and communication scholar recognized for her role in establishing and promoting the field of alternative media studies in English language media studies, notably through her work on 'citizens' media,' a term she coined in her 2001 book Fissures in the Mediascape and through co-founding and facilitating OURMedia/NuestrosMedios, a global network of researchers and practitioners of alternative media, community media and citizens' media, currently the biggest network of its kind with over 500 members in over 40 countries.

Dr. Rodriguez has conducted research since 1984 on citizens’ media in different international contexts including Nicaragua, Colombia, Spain, Chile, and among Latino communities in the United States. Her current research explores the role(s) of community radio and audiovisual initiatives in regions of armed conflict in Colombia. Her studies focus on the AREDMAG network of community radio stations in Magdalena Medio; the audiovisual school and community radio station (Radio Andaqui) in Belen de los Andaquies, Caqueta; and the Colectivo de Comunicacion de Montes de Maria.

In 2001, she initiated OURMedia/NUESTROSMedios with Chris Atton, Nick Couldry and John DH Downing and until 2003 was a key organizer of its yearly conferences.

== Citizens' media ==
“Various media technologies provide different ways of 'communicating' both in the kinds of information they present and in the ways we experience it”. Clemencia Rodriguez recognises a universal cultural change within the mediascape whereby media users have become media producers. She defines citizens' media as a concept 'that implies a collective embracing of new media and interaction, in a way that contests social codes, legitimised identities and institutionalised social relations, through a means of empowering the community'. Moving away from the original concept of media whereby “communication is sent from one place and received in many places by a large audience”, Citizens’ media’ encourages a two-way media process, reflecting participatory democracy and greater media access through networking, and broadcasting from citizen to citizen.

== Publications ==
- Rodríguez, Clemencia; Ferron, Benjamin and Shamas, Kristin (2014). "Four challenges in the field of alternative, radical and citizens' media research". Media, Culture & Society 1-17. Four challenges in the field of alternative, radical and citizens’ media research
- Rodríguez, Clemencia. (2011) Citizens’ Media Against Armed Conflict: Disrupting Violence in Colombia. Minneapolis: The University of Minnesota Press.
- Rodríguez, Clemencia; Kidd, Dorothy; and Stein, Laura (eds.). (2010). Creating New Communication Spaces. Volume I of “Making Our Media: Global Initiatives Toward a Democratic Public Sphere.” Euricom Monographs, Hampton Press.
- Dorothy Kidd and Rodríguez, Clemencia. (2010). “Introduction to Volume I.” In Rodríguez, Clemencia; Kidd, Dorothy; Stein, Laura (Eds.) Making Our Media: Global Initiatives Toward a Democratic Public Sphere. Volume I. Creating New Communication Spaces pp 1–22. Hampton Press.
- Rodríguez, Clemencia. (2010). “Knowledges in Dialogue: A Participatory Evaluation Study of Citizens’ Radio Stations in Magdalena Medio, Colombia.” In Rodríguez, Clemencia; Kidd, Dorothy; Stein, Laura (Eds.) Making Our Media: Global Initiatives Toward a Democratic Public Sphere, pp 131-154. Volume I. Creating New Communication Spaces. Hampton Press.
- Rodríguez, Clemencia. (2010) “Citizens’ Media.” In The Encyclopedia of Social Movement Media, pp. 98-103. Sage.
- Rodríguez, Clemencia. (2010) “Radio Andaquí and the Belén Media School.” In The Encyclopedia of Social Movement Media, pp. 430–431. Sage.
- Rodríguez, Clemencia. (2010) “Peace Media.” In The Encyclopedia of Social Movement Media, pp, 393-396. Sage.
- Rodríguez, Clemencia. (2010) Unhinged Realities: Communication and the Power of Performance. Media Development 4, 26-29.
- Rodríguez, Clemencia. (2010). "Entre la Soledad y el Absurdo: Ciudadanías en Medio de la Vorágine." In Franco, Natalia; Nieto, Patricia; and Rincón, Omar, (Eds.) Tácticas y Estrategias para Contar. Historias de la Gente sobre Conflicto y Reconciliación en Colombia, pp. 186 – 195. Bogotá: Centro de Competencias en Comunicación para América Latina, Friedrich Ebert Foundation.
- Stein, Laura; Kidd, Dorothy; and Rodríguez, Clemencia. (eds.). (2009). National and Global Movements for Democratic Communication. Volume II of “Making Our Media: Global Initiatives Toward a Democratic Public Sphere." Euricom Monographs, Hampton Press.
- Rodríguez, Clemencia. (2009). Introduction to Section 1. In Stein, Laura; Kidd, Dorothy; and Clemencia Rodríguez (eds.) Making Our Media: Global Initiatives Toward a Democratic Public Sphere. Volume II. National and Global Movements for Democratic Communication, pp 23–29. Euricom Monographs, Hampton Press.
- Vega, Jair and Rodríguez, Clemencia. (2009). “Citizens’ Media as political Subjects: The Case of Community Radio Stations in Magdalena Medio, Colombia.” In Thussu, Daya K. (ed.) Internationalizing Media Studies, pp 228-245. London: Routledge.
- Rodríguez, Clemencia. (2009). "Media poetics and cattle ranching. Making community radio relevant to language and power." The Upstream Journal. Canadian Perspectives on Global Justice 22(3): 14-16.
- Rodríguez, Clemencia. (ed.). (2008). Lo Que le Vamos Quitando a la Guerra. Medios Ciudadanos en Contextos de Conflicto Armado en Colombia. Bogotá, Colombia: Centro de Competencias en Comunicación, Fundación Friedrich Ebert.
- Rodríguez, Clemencia. (2008) “Citizens’ Media,” pp 493-495. The International Encyclopedia of Communication (ed. Donsbach), Volume 2. Oxford, UK and Malden, MA: Wiley-Blackwell.
- Rodríguez, Clemencia. (2008) “Radical Media,” pp 493–495. The International Encyclopedia of Communication (ed. Donsbach), Volume 2. Oxford, UK and Malden, MA: Wiley-Blackwell.
- Rodríguez, Clemencia and El-Gazi, Jeanine. (2007). “The Poetics of Indigenous Radio in Colombia.” Media, Culture, and Society 29(3): 449-468.
- Murphy, Patrick and Clemencia Rodríguez (guest editors of a special issue). (2006) "Mass Communication and the Question of Culture in Latin America." Global Media and Communication 2 (3).
- Rodríguez, Clemencia and Gonzáles, Alirio. (2007). “Tecnologías de Información y Comunicación para Construir Lugares de No Miedo. Aprendiendo de la Gente.” Dia-logos de la Comunicación, 75.
- Rodriguez, Clemencia and El-Gazi, Jeanine. (2007) “The Poetics of Indigenous Radio in Colombia.” Media, Culture, and Society 29(3): 449-468.
- Rodríguez, Clemencia and Gonzáles, Alirio. (2007) “Tecnologías de Información y Comunicación para Construir Lugares de No Miedo. Aprendiendo de la Gente.” Dia-logos de la Comunicación, 75.
- Murphy, Patrick D. and Clemencia Rodríguez (2006) “Introduction: Between Macondo and McWorld: communication and culture studies in Latin America.” Global Media and Communication 2(3): 267-277.
- Rodríguez, Clemencia and Cadavid, Amparo. (2006). “From Violence to Discourse. Conflict and Citizens’ Radio in Colombia”. In Raj Isar and Helmut K. Anheier (eds.). The Cultures and Globalization Series. Volume I. Conflicts and Tensions, 313-327. Thousand Oaks, CA: Sage. (Published by the UCLA Center for Civil Society).
- Rodriguez, Clemencia and El-Gazi, Jeanine. (2005). “La Poética de la Radio Indígena en Colombia.” Códigos (Universidad de las Américas, Puebla, Mexico).
- Rodríguez, Clemencia. (2005). “From the Sandinista Revolution to Telenovelas: The Case of Puntos de Encuentro, Nicaragua.” In Oscar Hemer and Thomas Tufte (eds). Media and Glocal Change. Rethinking Communication for Development, 367-384. Sweden: NORDICOM, University of Göteborg.
- Rodríguez, Clemencia (2004) The Renaissance of Citizens Media. Media Development. 2/2004.
- Rodríguez, Clemencia and O’Siochru, Sean. (2004). Framing Communication Rights. A Global Overview.
- Rodríguez, Clemencia. (2004). “De la Revolución Sandinista a las Telenovelas: El Caso de Puntos de Encuentro, Nicaragua.” Investigación y Desarrollo, 12, 1, 108-137.
- Rodríguez, Clemencia. (2004 December 6). Communication for Peace: Contrasting Approaches. The Drum Beat, issue 278.
- Rodríguez, Clemencia. (2004) Comunicación para la Paz: Enfoques Encontrados. Son de Tambora issue 88.
- Rodríguez, Clemencia (2003) "The Bishop and his Star." In N. Couldry & J. Curran (Eds.) Contesting Media Power: Alternative Media in a Networked World, pp. 177–194. Oxford: Rowman & Littlefield Publishers.
- Rodríguez, Clemencia. (2002). “Citizens’ Media and the Voice of the Angel/Poet.” Media International Australia # 103, 78-87. Reprinted as “Los Medios Ciudadanos y la Voz del Angel/Poeta.” Signo y Pensamiento 22, 124-133 (2003).
- Rodríguez, Clemencia (2001) Fissures in the Mediascape. An International Study of Citizens‘ Media. Cresskill, NJ: Hampton Press.
- Rodríguez, Clemencia. (2001). “Shattering Butterflies and Amazons. Women and Gender in a Colombian Development Project.” Communication Theory, 11:4, 472-494.
- Rodríguez, Clemencia. (2001). “Sociedad Civil y Medios Ciudadanos: Arquitectos de Paz para el Nuevo Milenio.” [The role of community media in war torn societies]. Revista de Estudios Sociales (Bogotá, Colombia), 8:73-82.
- Rodríguez, Clemencia. (2000). “Civil Society and Citizens’ Media: Peace Architects for the New Millennium.” In Karin Wilkins (ed.) Redeveloping Communication for Social Change: Theory, Practice, Power, 147-160. Boulder, CO: Rowman & Littlefield.
- Rodríguez, Clemencia & Murphy, Patrick (1997) The Study of Communication and Culture in Latin America: From Laggards and the Oppressed to Resistance and Hybrid Cultures. The Journal of International Communication. 4(2): 24-45.
- Rodríguez, Clemencia (1996) "Shedding Useless Notions of Alternative Media." Peace Review 8: 1, 63-6.
- Rodríguez, Clemencia. (1994). “The Rise and Fall of the Popular Correspondents' Movement in Revolutionary Nicaragua, 1982-1990.” Media, Culture & Society 16, 3: 509-520.
- Rodríguez, Clemencia. (1994). “A Process of Identity Deconstruction: Latin American Women Producing Video Stories.” In P. Riaño (ed.) Women in Grassroots Communication. Furthering Social Change, 149-160. Thousand Oaks, CA : Sage.

== See also ==
- Citizen media
- Citizen journalism
- Underground press
- Alternative weekly
- Advocacy journalism
- Community radio
