= Alternative press =

Alternative press may refer to:

== Individual publications ==
- Alternative Press (magazine), an American music magazine

== Alternative journalism ==
- Alternative media
  - Alternative media (U.S. political left)
  - Alternative media (U.S. political right)
  - Alternative media in the United Kingdom
- Alternative newspaper
  - List of alternative newspapers
- Independent media
- Radical media
- Underground press

== See also ==
- Alternative Comics, American comic book publisher which started out as Alternative Press
- Associated Press
- Association of Alternative Newsmedia, an American trade association of weekly newspapers
- The Alternative Press (TAPinto), an American network of local news sites
- The Alternative Press, artistic press founded in Detroit by Ken and Ann Mikolowski
