= Alternative media =

Media sources that differ from established or dominant types of media

Alternative media are media sources that differ from established forms of media, such as mainstream media or mass media, in terms of their content, production, or distribution. Alternative media includes many formats, including print, audio, film/video, online/digital and street art. Examples include the counter-culture zines of the 1960s, ethnic and indigenous media such as the First People's television network in Canada (later rebranded Aboriginal Peoples Television Network), and more recently online open publishing journalism sites such as Indymedia.

Sometimes the term "independent media" is used as a synonym, indicating independence from large news media corporations; however, "independent media" generally has a different meaning, indicating freedom of the press and independence from government control. In contrast to the mainstream media, alternative media tend to be "non-commercial projects that advocate the interests of those excluded from the mainstream", for example the poor, political and ethnic minorities, labor groups, and LGBT identities. These media spread marginalized viewpoints, such as those heard in the progressive news program Democracy Now!. They also create identity-based communities, such as in the It Gets Better Project that was posted on YouTube in response to a rise in gay teen suicides at the time of its creation.

Alternative media challenge the dominant beliefs and values of a culture. They have been described as "counter-hegemonic" by adherents of Antonio Gramsci's theory of cultural hegemony. Since the definition of alternative media as merely counter to the mainstream is limiting, some approaches to the study of alternative media also address the question of how and where these media are created, as well as the dynamic relationship between the media and the participants that create and use them, and their creators.

== Definitions ==
There are various definitions of "alternative media". For example, John Downing, defines "radical alternative media" as media "that express an alternative vision to hegemonic policies, priorities, and perspectives". In his assessment of a variety of definitions for the term, Chris Atton notes repeatedly the importance of alternative media production originating from small-scale, counter-hegemonic groups and individuals.

Christian Fuchs argues that alternative media must have four distinct properties. The first being that the audience of these media must be involved in the creation of what is put out in alternative media. The second is that it has to be different from the mainstream. The third is that it should create a perspective different from that of the state and major corporations. The fourth property is that alternative media must "establish different types of relationships with the market and/or the state."

As defined by Atton and Hamilton, alternative journalism "proceeds from dissatisfaction not only with the mainstream coverage of certain issues and topics but also with the epistemology of news. Its critique emphasizes alternatives to, inter alia, conventions of news sources and representation; the inverted pyramid of news texts; the hierarchical and capitalized economy of commercial journalism; the professional, elite basis of journalism as a practice; the professional norm of objectivity; and the subordinate role of the audience as a receiver."

Journalistic Practices says that alternative media "not only allow but also facilitate the participation (in its more radical meaning) of its members (or the community) in both the produced content and the content-producing organization.' In this sense, participation in alternative media as described and reflected upon by the participants in this study can best be understood as a form of active citizenship."

== Common approaches and practices ==
Approaches to the academic study of alternative media attempt to understand the ways in which these media are significant, each emphasizing a different aspect of media, including the role of the public sphere, social movements, and the participation by communities that create the media.

=== Democratic theory and the public sphere ===
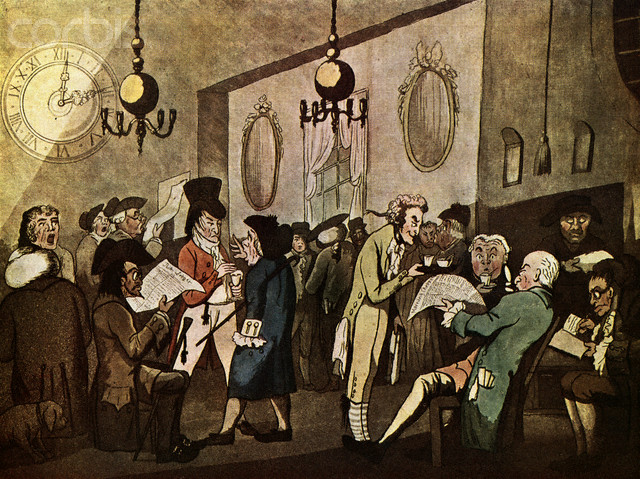
A public sphere described by Habermas - Coffee House in 18C

One way of understanding alternative media is to consider their role in the process of democratic communication. Philosopher Jürgen Habermas proposed that a healthy democratic community requires a space where rational debate can take place between engaged citizens. It is essential that the dialogue in this public sphere occurs outside the control of any authority so that citizens can exchange ideas as equals. This translates to the need for free speech and a free press.

In Habermas's idea of the public sphere, participation is open to everyone, all participants are considered equal, and any issue can be raised for debate; however, this view fails to note the inherent exclusion of women and minorities (and their interests) from the debate in the public sphere. In light of this social inequality, philosopher Nancy Fraser argues for the importance of multiple independent public spheres, in which members of subordinated groups can first deliberate their issues and concerns among themselves and later assert those issues into the larger public sphere. The alternative media associated with these counter-public spheres are critical in developing the needs and identity of the group and in challenging the larger dominant public sphere. A feminist counter-public sphere is, for example, responsible for circulating the view that women's issues such as domestic abuse and reproductive rights are deserving of debate in the larger public sphere.

=== Connections to subaltern studies ===
There are related aims found in alternative media studies and subaltern studies, as a concern for disenfranchised and oppressed voices pervades both fields. Subaltern studies draw on Antonio Gramsci's discussion of "subaltern" groups, that is, groups of people considered to be of inferior rank socially, economically, and politically. One of the most significant questions in subaltern studies is posed by Gayatri Chakravorty Spivak, "Can the subaltern speak?" which she asks in her seminal essay of the same name. Spivak investigates whether the subaltern has a voice within hegemonic political discourses, and if so if their voices are being heard, allowing them to participate. This is important, as the subaltern's ability to participate in politics and other social and cultural practices is key in establishing—as well as challenging—their subaltern status. This particular body of scholarship is useful to the study and discussion of alternative media due to their shared preoccupation with the ability of disenfranchised peoples to participate and contribute to mainstream hegemonic discourses, especially in regards to ethnic and racial media in which these groups speak from a subaltern position.

This connection is strengthened in the work of alternative media scholar Clemencia Rodriguez. In her discussion of citizenship, Rodriguez comments that "Citizens have to enact their citizenship on a day-to-day basis, through their participation in everyday political practices...As citizens actively participate in actions that reshape their own identities, the identities of others, and their social environments, they produce power." So it could be said that by subaltern groups creating alternative media, they are indeed expressing their citizenship, producing their power, and letting their voice be heard.

=== Genres ===
Some alternative media can be associated with the American Left, the American Right, and various political positions in the United Kingdom. Primarily concerned with the growing role of new media in alternative media projects, communication scholar Leah Lievrouw identifies five genres of contemporary new media based alternative and activist media: culture jamming, alternative computing, participatory journalism, mediated mobilization, and commons knowledge.

- Culture jamming generally attempts to critique popular cultures such as entertainment, advertising, and art. It tends to comment on issues of corporate capitalism and consumerism and seeks to provide political commentary. Characteristics of culture jamming texts include the appropriation or repurposing of images, video, sound, or text and that they are ironic or satirical in some sense. Culture jamming can come in the form of internet memes and guerrilla marketing.
- Alternative computing deals with the material infrastructure of informational and communications technologies. It seeks to critique and reconfigure systems with the intention of subverting or evading commercial and political restraints on open access to information and information technologies. Some examples of alternative computing are hacking, open source software or systems, and file sharing.
- Participatory journalism refers to web-based sources of critical or radical news either in the form of online news services or blogs. These alternative outlets of news often adopt the philosophies of citizen journalism and view themselves as providing an alternative to mainstream news and opinion. Participatory journalism projects may cover underreported groups and issues. Within this genre authors and readers of some of these alternative media projects have the ability contribute alike and therefore has the characteristic of being participatory or interactive. An example of participatory journalism is Indymedia and wearecgange.org.
- Mobilization media relate to communication practices that mobilization or organization social movements, identity, or cultural projects through the use of new media tools and platforms such as Facebook or YouTube. Characteristics of this genre include the cultivation of interpersonal networks, collective action towards social change, and making information much readily accessible.
- Commons knowledge as a genre refers to projects that provide alternatives to the traditional top-down creation and dissemination of knowledge. It seeks out and encourages the participation of multiple users, fostering forms of collaborative knowledge production and folksonomies. Wikipedia is an excellent example of this genre.

Thinking of current forms of alternative media in terms of the genre not only allows one to identify the features and conventions of certain modes of communication, but also how "they allow people to express themselves appropriately, and to achieve their various purposes or intentions." In other words, one can begin to understand how the creators and participants of alternative new media projects actively shape their communication practices.

YouTube is considered to be not only a commercial enterprise but also a platform designed to encourage cultural participation by ordinary citizens. Although YouTube aimed to be foremost a commercial enterprise, nevertheless, it has become a community media as one of the forms of alternative media. Scholars assume that YouTube's commercial drive may have increased the probability of participation in online video culture for a broader spectrum of participants than before. This idea allows one to shift our concern away from the false contradiction between market-driven and non-market-driven culture towards the tensions between corporate logics and unruly and emergent traits of participatory culture, and the limits of YouTube model for cross-cultural diversity and global communication. In theory, YouTube stands as a site of cosmopolitan cultural citizenship. Uploading foreign soap opera episodes and dividing into several pieces to pass YouTube's content limits, can be seen as acts of cultural citizenship similar to the media sharing practices of diverse communities identified by Cunningham and Nguyen (2000); however, people who have the highest chance of encountering other cultural citizens are those who have the access to various contents, information and platforms; this is commonly referred to as the "participation gap". The notion of participation gap makes both digital literacy and digital divide such important issues for cultural politics. Therefore, it is still controversial whether YouTube is just another conduit for strengthening cultural imperialism or one of the alternative media.

=== Aesthetics ===
In association with experimental and innovative modes of production and collaboration, aesthetics in alternative media can be a political tool used to subvert dominant power. Like many makers of alternative media, scholar Crispin Sartwell identifies politics as an aesthetic environment. As such, these art political systems not only use aesthetics as a tool to gain power but are also produced via aesthetic forms within all media. Thus, it is not uncommon for alternative media to seek new artistic, non-traditional, or avant-garde means to represent its content. In this case, the use of aesthetics allows alternative media to address otherwise banal content in a manner which re-aligns, re-negotiates, or exposes the politics at work within it.

=== Form ===
Scholars have linked the Avant-garde art movements as one arena where alternative aesthetics are used as a political tool. Movements such as Futurism, Dada, and Situationism looked to challenge the formal rules regarding what art was, how it looked or sounded like, or where it could be in order to radically alter public and political ideology. The logic, reason, and rules of style and beauty, mandated by the dominant class, was rejected as an affirmation of subjugation.

=== Appropriation ===
While some alternative makers look to radically break away from the suffocating restraints of the dominant class by rejecting their dominant visual dogma, others appropriate, twist, and remix in order to subvert dominant language and messaging through mimicry, mockery, and satire. The détournement (and its successor culture-jamming) of the Situationists, the mimicry of Pop Art, and the reworking of normative narratives in slash fiction are examples of appropriation of mainstream media texts.

== By subject matter ==
=== Social movement media ===
Social movements are a type of collective action. They involve large, sometimes informal, groups or organizations which focus on specific political or social issues and promote, instigate, resist or undo the social change. Social movement media is how social movements use media, and oftentimes, due to the nature of social movements, that media tends to be an alternative.

Communication is vital to the success of social movements. Research shows that social movements experience significant difficulties communicating through mainstream media because the mainstream media often systematically distort, stigmatize, or ignore social movement viewpoints. They may deny social movements' access or representation at critical moments in their development, employ message frames that undermine or weaken public perceptions of a movement's legitimacy or implicitly encourage movement actors who seek coverage to cater to the questionable values of mainstream reportage on social activism, including a heightened interest in violence, emotionality, and slogans. This problematic coverage of social movements is often referred to as the protest paradigm: the idea that mass media marginalizes protest groups through their depictions of the protesters, and, by doing so, subsequently support the status quo. As a result, social movements often turn to alternative media forms and practices in order to more effectively achieve their goals. An example of how the mainstream media problematically covers social movements is the Occupy movement, which began with Occupy Wall Street in September 2011. The Occupy movement protested against social and economic inequality around the world, its primary goal being to make the economic and political relations in all societies less vertically hierarchical and more flatly distributed. Among the movement's primary concerns is the system which allows large corporations and the global financial system to manipulate the world in a way that disproportionately benefits a wealthy minority, undermines democracy, and disregards environmental sustainability. In comparing the mainstream news coverage of the Occupy movement against coverage from alternative press several trends emerge. First, mainstream media used confusion over the event as the dominant frame while alternative media focused on what the demonstrators were actually trying to accomplish. Second, the mainstream media placed the protesters at fault of any violence while the alternative media focused on the brutality of the police and their violent acts on the peaceful protesters.

Alternative media tend to be activist by nature. Social movements in areas such as human rights, the environmental movement, and civil rights produce alternative media to further their goals, spread awareness, and inspire participation and support.

=== Human rights ===
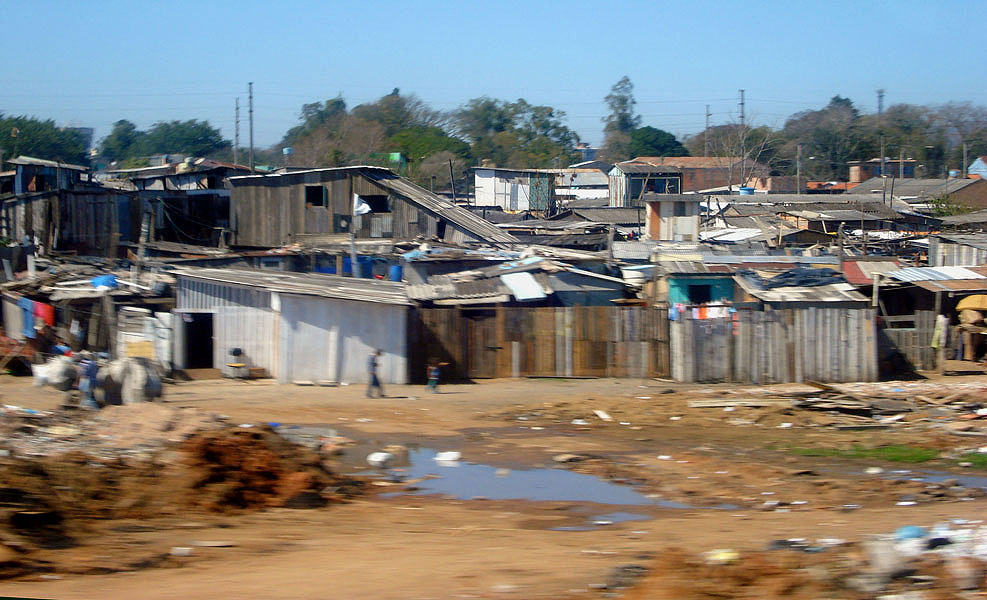
A favela in Brazil

An example of a human rights social movement using alternative media is the group WITNESS. WITNESS is a human rights non-profit organization and its mission is to partner with on-the-ground organizations to support the documentation of human rights violations and their consequences, in order to further public engagement, policy change, and justice. They rely on video recordings using technology such as handheld camcorders and smartphones to capture the world's attention and viscerally communicate human rights abuses. They have documented human rights abuses from the police in the favelas of Brazil, children soldiers in the Democratic Republic of the Congo, human trafficking in Brazil and the United States, and many other human rights issues, all through the use of alternative media.

=== Environmental movement ===
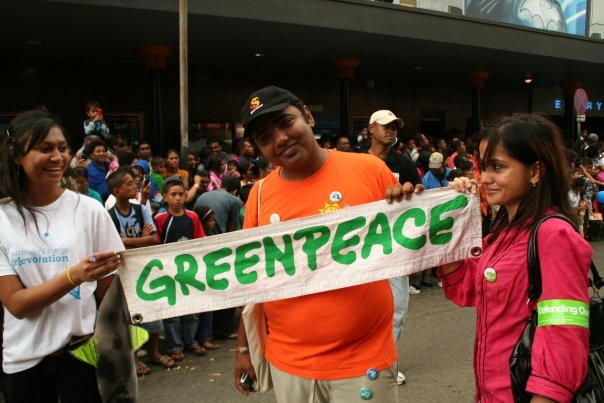
Protester at a Greenpeace march in 2009

An example of an environment movement using alternative media is the group Greenpeace. Greenpeace is a non-governmental environmental organization whose goal is to "ensure the ability of the Earth to nurture life in all its diversity and focuses its campaigning on worldwide issues such as climate change, deforestation, overfishing, commercial whaling, genetic engineering, and anti-nuclear issues. It uses direct action, lobbying, and research to achieve its goals, as well as alternative media. They use online tactics such as podcasts and blogs as well as performance art.

=== Civil rights ===
An example of a civil rights group using alternative media was the Student Non-violent Coordinating Committee (SNCC). SNCC was one of the most important organizations of the American Civil Rights Movement in the 1960s. SNCC was involved in voter registration rights in the south, established Freedom Schools, organized the Mississippi Freedom Democratic Party (MFDP), among many other accomplishments. Alternative media tactics used by SNCC included establishing a dedicated Communication Section which included a photography arm, its own printing press (which published its newsletter the Student Voice), published publicity materials, and created an alternative wire press.

=== Community media ===
Community media includes citizens' media, participatory media, activist and radical media as well as the broader forms of communication in which local or regional specific platforms are engaged. Like other forms of alternative media, community media seeks to bypass the commercialization of media. The elimination or avoidance of sole ownership or sponsorship is motivated by a desire to be free of oversight or obligation to cater to a specific agenda. Community media is often categorized as grassroots, a description that applies to both the financial structure and the process of content creation. While there is diversity in community media, which varies by media platform (radio, TV, web or print), it is typical that the media source is open to the public/community to submit material and content. This open policy aligns with the values of community media to maintain a democratic approach and ethos. Historically, community media has served to provide an alternative political voice. Across the world, forms of community media are used to elevate the needs and discourse of a specific space, typically connected by geographical, cultural, social, or economic similarities.

=== Race and indigenous media ===
Minority community media can be both localized and national, serving to disseminate information to a targeted demographic. They provide a platform for discussion and exchange within the minority communities as well as between the minority and the majority communities. Oftentimes minority-focused media serves an essential resource, providing their audiences with essential information, in their own language of origin, helping the specified group to participate as equal citizens of their country of residence. These media platforms and outlets create an opportunity for cultural exchange and the elevation or empowerment of a disenfranchised or marginalized group, based on racial, ethnic or cultural identity. Historically, these forms of media have served a dual purpose, to disseminate information to a community that is traditionally ignored or overlooked by major media outlets and as a vehicle for political protest or social reform.

Spaces created to address minority discourse typically straddle the line of both alternative and activist media, working to provide a resource unavailable through mainstream measures and to shift the universally accepted perspective or understanding of a specific group of people. Sociologist Yu Shi's exploration of alternative media provides opposing arguments about the role of minority media to both facilitate cultural place-making and hinder community assimilation and acculturation. Shi expounds a widely shared understanding that racially informed media provide a place, power, and political agency.

Throughout the 20th-century, media spaces were developed to accommodate the growing multi-cultural state of the United States. African-Americans created local publications like the Chicago Defender to share critical information to protect citizens from discriminatory practices by police and policy-makers, while Jet and Ebony's magazine served to empower the national black identity, lauding the achievements and thought leadership of Black Americans. Similar practices became increasingly common for Latino/Latina and Asian groups. As immigration increased post-1965, Spanish-language newspapers and television stations, along with the creation of television networks like ICN-TV specifically for Chinese immigrants. A critical awareness of an increasingly participatory global media culture in multicultural societies is becoming widespread and a necessary approach to explaining the success and impact of ethnic or minority media, as well as to embrace the changing ways in which people 'use' their media.

== Participatory culture ==
Alternative media have frequently been studied as a manifestation of participatory culture, in which citizens do not act as consumers only, but as contributors or producers as well. By opening up access to media production, participatory culture is believed to further democracy, civic engagement, and creative expression. Participatory culture pre-dates the Internet. Amateur Press Associations are a form of participatory culture that emerged late in the 19th century. Members of such associations typeset and print their own publications, which are mailed through a network of subscribers. Zines, community-supported radio stations, and other types of projects were predecessors of blogs, podcasts, wikis, and social networks. Web services such as Tumblr, Imgur, Reddit, Medium, TikTok, and YouTube, among others, allow users to distribute original content to wider audiences, which makes media production more participatory.

Alternative media are created by participatory journalism as citizens play an active role in collecting, reporting, analyzing, and disseminating news and information. This form of alternative and activist news-gathering and reporting functions outside of mainstream media institutions, often as a response to the shortcomings of professional journalism. It engages in journalistic practices but is driven by goals other than profit making, has different ideals, and relies on alternative sources of legitimacy.

Participatory media approaches consider participation in producing media content as well as in making decisions about media production processes as a defining feature of alternative media. Participatory culture can be realized in a number of ways. Media literacy is a way to begin participating by understanding media systems' conventions and means of production. Individuals learning to produce media themselves is the step that moves citizens from literacy to participation. Fan fiction, community radio (or low-power FM), and hyper-local blogging are just a few ways that citizens can produce media content to participate in the production of alternative media.

By fostering participation, alternative media contribute to the strengthening of a civic attitude and allow citizens to be active in one of the main spheres relevant to daily life and to put their right to communication into practice. To demonstrate the relationship between democracy and participation in media production, the term citizen's media illustrates that alternative media can help those who are producing media also become active citizens – particularly in a democracy. This idea is tied very closely to community media.

== Forms of media ==
=== Press – print ===
The alternative press consists of printed publications that provide a different or dissident viewpoint than that provided by major mainstream and corporate newspapers, magazines, and other print media. Factsheet Five publisher Mike Gunderloy described the alternative press as "sort of the 'grown-up' underground press. Whole Earth, the Boston Phoenix, and Mother Jones are the sorts of things that fall in this classification." In contrast, Gunderloy described the underground press as "the real thing, before it gets slick, co-opted, and profitable. The underground press comes out in small quantities, is often illegible, treads on the thin ice of unmentionable subjects, and never carries ads for designer jeans."

An example of alternative media is tactical media, which uses "hit-and-run" tactics to bring attention to an emerging problem. Often tactical media attempts to expose large corporations that control sources of mainstream media. One prominent NGO dedicated to tactical media practices and info-activism is the Tactical Technology Collective which assists human rights advocates in using technology. They have released several toolkits freely to the global community, including NGO In A Box South Asia, which assists in the setting up the framework of a self-sustaining NGO, Security-In-A-Box, a collection of software to keep data secure and safe for NGOs operating in potentially hostile political climates, and their new short form toolkit 10 Tactics, which provides "original and artful ways for rights advocates to capture attention and communicate a cause".

=== Radio ===
Radio has been a significant form of alternative media due to its low cost, ease of use, and near ubiquity. Alternative radio has arisen in response to capitalist and/or state-sponsored mainstream radio broadcasts. For example, in early 1970s Australia, a new alternative radio sector was created by those who felt excluded from the two-sector national broadcasting system, consisting of a national public service broadcaster and commercial services. In the US, the first listener-supported independent station, KPFA, began in 1949 in order to provide an avenue for free speech unconstrained by the commercial interests that characterized mainstream radio.

Their content ranges broadly; while some stations' primary aims are explicitly political and radical, others namely seek to broadcast music that they believe to be excluded from mainstream radio. Alternative radio often, though not always, takes the form of community radio, which is generally understood as participatory, open, non-profit, and made by and for a community. These radio stations may broadcast legally or illegally, as pirate radio. Alternative radio is a global phenomenon. Examples of community and alternative radio endeavors include Tilos Rádió (Hungary), Missinipi Broadcasting Corporation (Canada), Pacifica Radio and the Prometheus Radio Project (both in the United States), and Radio Sagarmatha (Nepal).

=== Video and film ===
Alternative film and video are generally produced outside of the mainstream film and video industries and features content and/or style that is rarely seen in mainstream product; however, its particular genre, content, and form vary widely. It is often produced in non-profit organizational contexts, such as video art collectives (e.g. Videotage, Los Angeles Filmmakers' Cooperative) or grassroots social justice organizations (e.g. Line Break, CINEP—Center for Research and Popular Education). Participatory video projects in which marginalized or under-resourced groups tell their stories through video demonstrate the possibility for access and participation in video-making to empower those involved, circulate representations unseen in mainstream media, and challenge existing power relations.

Alternative film in the United States is evident in the work of The Film & Photo League chapters of the 1930s, which drew attention to union and class issues through social documentary film and the editing of newsreels. Though initiated in the 1960s and 1970s, radical video making reached an apex in the 1980s, as technology became more accessible. Public access television provided a broadcast outlet for oftentimes punk and hip-hop-influenced radical cultural critique. Deep Dish TV, for instance, is a television network which seeks to provide media access to grassroots organizations and to marginalized or misrepresented perspectives through public access television. Portable and accessible recording technology and the internet allow increasing opportunities for global participation in the production, consumption, and exchange of alternative video content.

=== Internet ===
With the increasing importance attributed to digital technologies, questions have arisen about where digital media fit in the dichotomy between alternative and mainstream media. First, blogs, Facebook, Twitter and other similar sites, while not necessarily created to be information media, increasingly are being used to spread news and information, potentially acting as alternative media as they allow ordinary citizens to bypass the gatekeepers of traditional, mainstream media and share the information and perspectives these citizens deem important.

Second, the Internet provides an alternative space for mobilization through the cultivation of interpersonal networks, collective action towards social change, and making information much readily accessible. Typically, among those with deviant, dissident or non-traditional views, Internet platforms allow for the creation of new, alternative communities that can provide a voice for those normally marginalized by the mainstream media. In addition, the Internet has also led to an alternative form of programming, which allows both professionals and amateurs to subvert or evade commercial and political restraints on open access to information and information technologies. Some examples of alternative computing are hacking, open source software or systems, and file sharing. Lastly, the Internet also breeds a new way of creation and dissemination of knowledge—commons knowledge—that is different from the top-down manner. It seeks out and encourages the participation of multiple users, fostering forms of collaborative knowledge production and folksonomies. Wikipedia is an excellent example of this genre.

=== Street art ===
Often considered guerilla-art, street art operates free from the confines of the formal art world. In the form of graffiti, stencil, mural, and print, street art appropriates or alters public spaces as a means of protest and social commentary. Important aspects of street art as an alternative form are its blend of aesthetics and social engagement, use of urban spaces, and interaction with the social landscape of the area in which the art is made.

The street art movement gained popularity in the 1980s as a form of art distinct from high art and commercial venues, but as popularity grew, some street artists moved from the alternative venues of the streets to gallery and museum showings. Cities such as Paris, Buenos Aires, and São Paulo rose to prominence in using street art as legitimate alternative media through artist collectives and competitions, bringing attention to alternative voices. The internet has also influenced street art greatly by functioning as a platform for artists and fans to share pictures of street art from around the world. Websites like Streetsy.com and WoosterCollective.com are among the most popular of street art sharing sites.

=== Performance ===
Performance as an alternative medium uses theater, song, and performance art as a means of engaging audiences and furthering social agendas. Performance art is an avant garde art form that typically uses live performances to challenge traditional forms of visual art. It operates as "the antithesis of theatre, challenging orthodox art forms and cultural norms." Playing an important role in social and cultural movements from Dada and Surrealism to Post-Minimalism, performance art reflects the political environment of the time. While performance art is often relegated to high art, street theater is typically used in a grassroots fashion, utilizing local communities for performance or conversation. It can be used as a form of guerilla theater to protest, like in the case of The Living Theatre which is dedicated to transforming the hierarchy of power in society through experimental theater.

=== Music ===
Certain genres of music and musical performance can be categorized as alternative media. Independent music, or indie music, is music that is produced separate from commercial record labels. Professor David Hesmondhalgh describes indie music's alternative nature as a "hard-headed network of post-punk companies which made significant challenges to the commercial organization of cultural production favoured by the major record companies." Its subversive roots of sound or lyrics and alternative models of distribution distinguish it from the commercial record companies.

== Participation ==
Avant-garde movements that have emphasized audience participation include Futurism, Dadaism, Surrealism, Situationism, Pop art, Neo-concretism, and the Theatre of the Oppressed. By inviting the audience to participate in the creation of media, collaborators look to subvert or critique hierarchical structures (capitalism, the ivory tower) within society by embracing democratic modes of production. Strategies that involve the input or collaboration of all stakeholders often result in less formally 'correct' aesthetics.

== Notable media scholars ==
- Chris Atton
- Rodney Benson
- Jean Burgess
- John D. H. Downing
- Lauren Kessler
- Clemencia Rodriguez
- Åsa Wettergren

== See also ==
- Alternative facts – Expression associated with political misinformation established in 2017
- Alternative media in South Africa – Media sector in South Africa
- Alternative media in the United Kingdom
- Alternative press (disambiguation)
- Alt-right – Far-right white nationalist movement
- Alt-tech – Internet platforms favored by the alt-right
- Fake news – False information presented as news
- Grey literature – Documents and research not produced for commercial or academic journal purposes
- Junk food news – Sardonic term for trivial news stories
- Left-wing alternative media in the United States
- Le Peuple breton – French news magazine
- Pirate television – Broadcast TV station operating without a license
- Right-wing alternative media in the United States – Conservative journalism
- Samizdat – Underground publications in the Soviet bloc
