= Shah Hussain Murtazavi =

Afghan politician and journalist

Shah Hussain Murtazavi شاه‌حسین مرتضوی

Deputy to the President's Spokesperson

Personal details
- Born: Ghazni province, Afghanistan
- Occupation: Politician

Shah Hussain Murtazavi (Dari: شاه‌حسین مرتضوی) is a politician and a journalist from Afghanistan. He was the deputy spokesman for President Ashraf Ghani and is one of the media activists.

== Early life ==
Shah Hussain Murtazavi was born in Ghazni province, Afghanistan and he is part of the ethnic Hazaras. He completed his higher education in international relations.
