= John Adair (anthropologist) =

American anthropologist

John Adair (1913 in Memphis, Tennessee – December 14, 1997 in San Francisco, California), was an American anthropologist best known for work in visual anthropology but also very much involved and interested in applied anthropology.

After serving in World War II, he moved to the University of New Mexico to finish his graduate studies, becoming the university's first doctoral candidate in anthropology in 1948. Adair than moved to Zuni with his pregnant wife Casey and their son. His sole purpose of moving to Zuni was to gather information that he could use in his dissertation, "The Veterans of World War II at Zuni Pueblo", which was never published.

Cornell University hired him in 1948. The school asked him to teach a series of field seminars in the Southwest. The resulting studies in the Southwest were published as the book First Look at Strangers in 1959.

Adair joined the Cornell-Navajo Field Health Research Project at Many Farms, located on the Navajo Reservation in Arizona, working there as chief anthropologist from 1953 to 1960. He, along with many other anthropologists, played an important role in this project. They were asked to provide anthropological insight, perspectives, and methodologies. Adair and two other anthropologists published a report of the project in The People's Health in 1970 and later revised the report in 1988.

Adair worked with the National Institute of Mental Health (NIMH) from 1961 to 1964. At the conclusion of his work in the NIMH, he became Professor of Anthropology at San Francisco State University, where he remained until his retirement in 1978.

He is also known for the 1972 book, Through Navajo Eyes: An Exploration in Film Communication and Anthropology, which he co-authored with Sol Worth.
