= NewBostonPost =

American conservative website

NewBostonPost is an American conservative website that publishes news and political commentary pertaining to Massachusetts. It was founded in 2015 by Massachusetts Family Institute co-founder Robert Bradley.

The website's culturally conservative reporting has been compared to other state-specific and national conservative alternative media outlets in the United States, including The Tennessee Star and Breitbart.
