= Media activism =

Form of activism using media for social or political movements

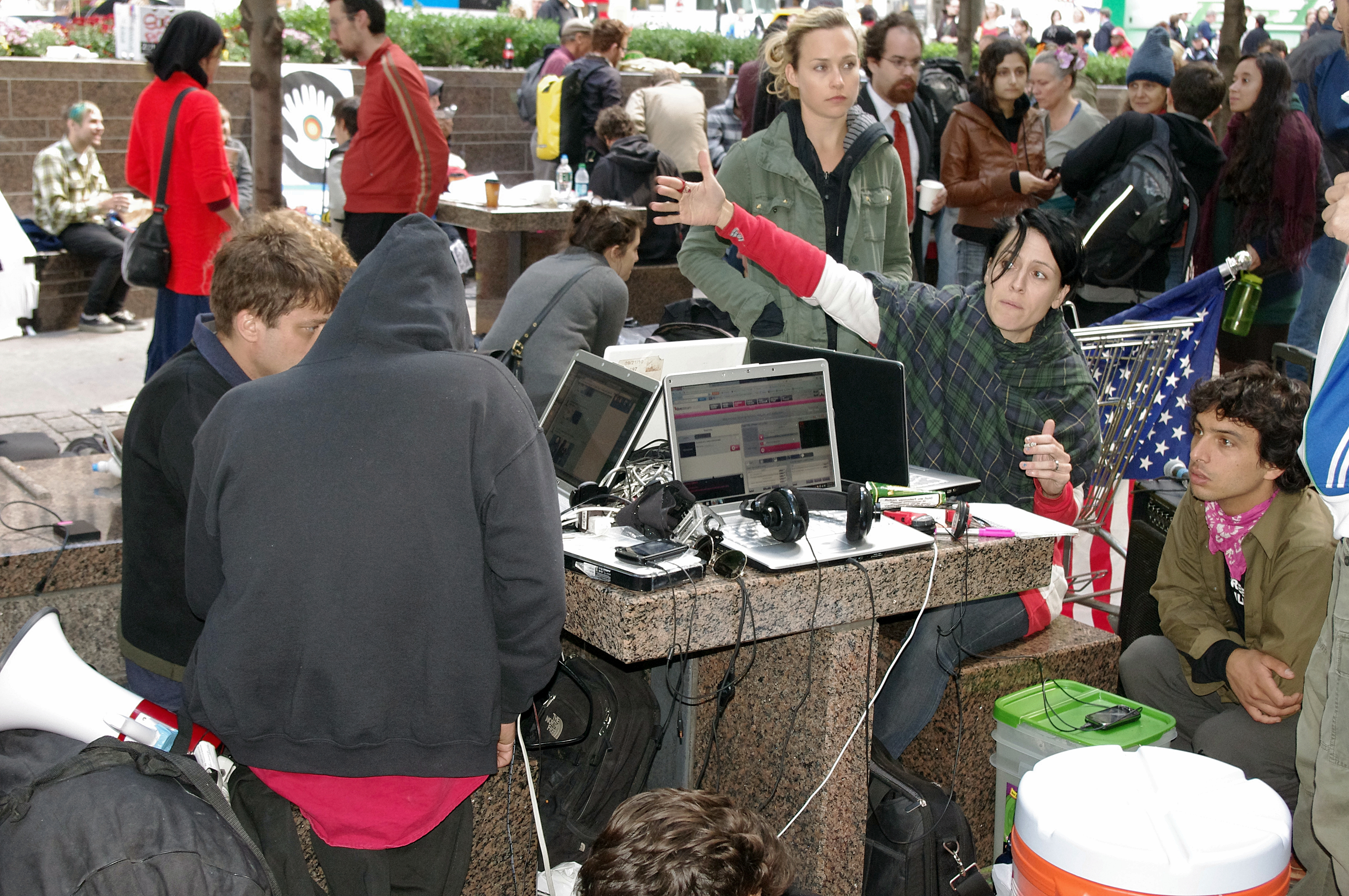
Occupy Wall Street protesters in Zuccotti Park using their laptops, September 2011

Media activism is a broad category of activism that utilizes media and communication technologies for social and political movements. Methods of media activism include publishing news on websites, creating video and audio investigations, spreading information about protests, or organizing campaigns relating to media and communications policies.

Media activism is used for many different purposes. It is often a tool for grassroots activists and anarchists to spread information not available via mainstream media or to share censored news stories. Certain forms of politically motivated hacking and net-based campaigns are also considered media activism. Typically, the purpose of media activism is to spread awareness through media communications which sometimes leads to action.

Media activism gives disadvantaged groups the ability to have their own voices heard and organize in bigger groups allowing for more autonomous activism to enact social change. As well as disadvantaged communities, media activism allows younger generations to have a voice in situations where legally they cannot - for example when they are too young to vote. The internet allows for these individuals to avoid feeling helpless when they cannot vote. This is a free way for leaders to organize and allows more individuals interested in engaging with certain movements online rather than in person to speak up. On the other hand, this is also a common form of activism for celebrities to use and there is debate on how effective it really is. One criticism of Media Activism is that since everyone has a voice radicals sound as loud as the average whether it's one person or not which can undermine the movement entirely.

== Forms of media activism ==
Social media is often used as a form of media activism. Because of the interactive features and widespread adoption, users can quickly disseminate information and rally supporters. Platforms like Facebook and Twitter can reach a much larger audience than traditional media. Although often only a small percentage of people who express interest in a cause online are willing to commit to offline action, social media interaction is viewed as "the first step in a ladder of engagement"."Social media has helped us organize without having leaders," said Victor Damaso, 22, demonstrating on São Paulo's main Paulista Avenue on Thursday night. "Our ideas, our demands are discussed on Facebook. There are no meetings, no rules".

Live streams applications or websites such as Livestream is another media form which can replace TV when there is a kind of censorship. The protests in Istanbul can be an example of this way of broadcasting in terms of the lack of the objectivity of the actual media and the television. On the other hand, a lot of protestors used WhatsApp or the Walkie-Talkie application with their smartphones in order to improve communication between protestors during the manifestations thanks to its quick and instantaneous sharing of information. Moreover, the usage of applications such as WhatsApp can improve organization among protestors with added features such as group message. Similarly, YouTube is another efficient tool of spreading information and is generally used with other social media forms such as Facebook and Twitter.

Culture-jamming practices include advertising parody, media hoaxes and street art. The edited collection Culture Jamming: Activism and the Art of Cultural Resistance (2017) also discusses how such tactics have been adopted by commercial advertisers, raising questions about their effectiveness as forms of cultural resistance.

Media activism has expanded its scope to include fields of study such as journalism and news media. Media activism additionally educates the audience to be producers of their own media. Media activism to be expanded to facilitate action through media production and involvement.

== Case studies ==
Social Media has become a primary organizing tool for political and social movements globally. They serve to strengthen already existing networks of political and social relationships among activists offline. Media activism among youth can be linked to the way youth protest and create communities online over specific issues and social connections.

=== China ===
China has strong censorship laws in place, where the press freedoms are not considered free, rather oppressive. Youth in China have worked towards stronger press freedoms online and a dedication to utilizing the principles of media activism. Intensive civic conversation occurs online in China. Youth satirized the government through what came to be known as "the River Crab critique," in turn spurring civic conversation on the internet. Media Activists in China used their online presence and freedom to alter images, such as Marilyn Monroe, to have the face of Chinese Communist leader Mao Zedong. This image was coined as Maorilyn Maoroe, which in the image is juxtaposed next to a homophone for profanity. "Maorilyn Maoroe" was an opponent to the societal River Crab, which is a pun on "harmonious," a principle that Chinese censorship was created to promote, but has failed to do so.

In China, youth and other media activists have discovered and utilized new methods to indirectly criticize the political and societal environments, going around the government censorship. Social media is among the newest method of critique. Activists use "microblogs" to critique the government. Blogging can therefore be seen as a media activist approach to civic participation within the bounds of government censorship.

=== North Africa & The Middle East ===
==== Arab Spring ====
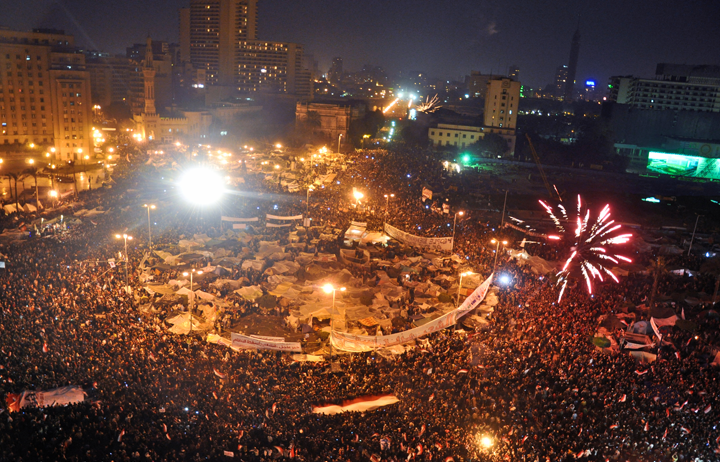
Protesters in Egypt celebrate in Tahrir Square after President Mubarak announced his resignation.

The 2011 Arab Spring uprisings made extensive use of social media activism within the countries of Tunisia, Libya and Egypt. These nations concentrated on the ability of the society to operate social media and begin organizing a grassroots initiative for a globalized form of democracy. Arab youth population are described as "opening" societies through social media in places where governments are otherwise repressive.

Egyptian protesters utilized social media to reduce the difficulties and cost associated with organizing rallies and a readily-mobilized political force. This facilitation of assembly through social media allowed the creation of new gateways for civic engagement where Egypt had suppressed such opportunities under emergency power for the last 30 years. This uprising led to violent conflict within each of the nations, and can thus media and media activism can be viewed as a fundamental contributor to the nation's new national identity under a new rule.

=== Philippines ===
The Philippines was once said to have the freest press in Southeast Asia, after the ousting of Ferdinand Marcos, due to the subsequent rapid expansion of newspapers, radio stations, and programming throughout the country. This has changed over the years, especially after events such as the Maguindanao massacre, where 34 journalists were killed in a single event. Competing interests within traditional media also complicate the landscape of journalistic transparency—a number of the country's largest newspapers are owned by a few select families who compete in both business and politics. In response, local organizations have turned to alternative forms of information dissemination. For example, indigenous groups in the Philippines have developed their online media presence in order to build international awareness of local issues—such as land grabbing—since local corporations and political powers and influence over the mainstream media.

==== Mary Jane Veloso ====
In 2010, Mary Jane Veloso, an overseas Filipino domestic worker, was arrested and convicted in Indonesia for attempting to smuggle 5.7lb of heroin. She was placed on death row and was initially set to be executed. Human rights organizations claimed that Veloso was used by her recruiters as a drug mule and should be given the opportunity to defend herself in court. Through a joint effort of legal advocacy and online media activism, Veloso's execution was delayed. The petition on Change.org to support her was one of the fastest-growing and most signed online petitions from the region.

=== United States ===
Media activism has a long history in the United States including the revolutionary pamphleteers of the Revolutionary War, the abolitionist press in the decades leading up to the Civil War and the socialist press during the years of the labor movement such as The Appeal to Reason which supported the presidential candidate Eugene Debs.

==== Occupy Wall Street ====
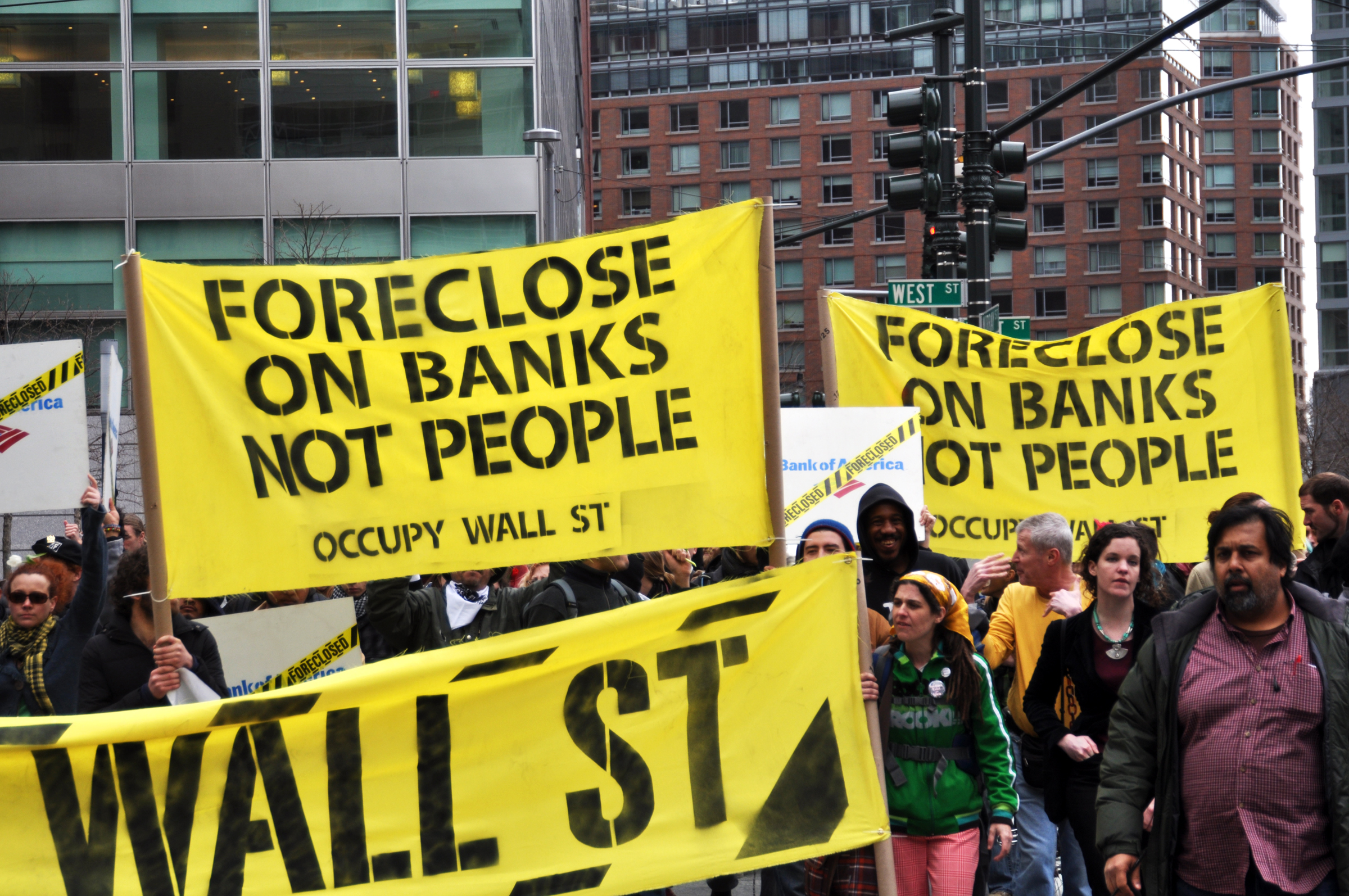
Protestors as a part of the occupy wall street movement

The Occupy Wall Street movement, which began during the fall of 2011, is another instance were social media largely contributed to the efforts of the initiative. It was a people powered movement beginning September 17, 2011 in Liberty Square in Manhattans financial district. As Occupy Wall Street sprang up in parks and under tents, one of the main issues the protesters pushed was economic inequality. Then with the winter pressing forward the police swept the protesters away. All across the country the crowds began to thin and enthusiasm diminished, and eventually the movement all but dissolved. The catch phrase that became well known by the occupants was "We are the 99 percent." The 99 percent were referred to as the lower-income people that are struggling to make a change. This was in contrast to the 1% who were well off financially and were in control of social, political and economic levers of powers. From here it spread to cities all over the United States, and globally. The movement came about because of the popular uprisings in Tunisia and Egypt. Its main goal was to fight against the unequal income gap and the corrupting influence of money. Although many people believed that the movement disappeared, it has instead evolved into a variety of different causes. One of Occupies largest unrecognized victories is the drive for a higher minimum wage. The occupy protests helped to motivate workers in the fast food industry in New York City to walk off their jobs in November, 2012, triggering national movement to raise the minimum wage to $15 an hour. This march in New York helped lead the way for tens of thousands of workers who marched in hundreds of cities asking for better paying conditions. Occupy Wall Street protesters capitalized on the tools of social media to spread awareness about the movement, to inform participants about organized meetings, rallies, and events, and to ultimately generate national news and mainstream media attention. Social media handles like Facebook and Twitter were used to bring people from all over to one place for an agreed upon cause. It started off with the small number of people who had the idea. Once the events, rallies and protests began, it gained the attention from mass media. This ultimately created a huge platform for the change these participants yearned for.

==== Black Lives Matter ====
Black Lives Matter, a campaign against violence and systemic racism towards African Americans, has been influenced strongly by Social Media Activism with leaders, hashtags, and policy proposals brought forward because of Social Media. The hashtag #blacklivesmatter was created in 2013 by Patrisse Cullors, Alicia Garza, and Opal Tometi after the acquittal of George Zimmerman for the murder in Florida of seventeen-year-old Trayvon Martin. Garza wrote a Facebook post titled "A Love Note to Black People" in which she said: "Our Lives Matter, Black Lives Matter." Once the hashtag was formed, it has been a rallying cry for various organizing efforts across the country centered on Black lives.

It is a movement that brings the African American community together. It is a campaign that does not promote violence but instead unity. There can be both negative or positive views on the movement due to the way the media affects people. This movement began in 2013 when people started hash tagging #BLM, #BlackLivesMatter, and #equality on Twitter, Facebook, and many social media platforms. In response to the visible violent acts against Black communities more than 50 organizations from across the country have come together to fight this unfairness based on color. Today this is still an issue, and in some peoples' opinion media does not have a positive effect on BLM. It causes people to riot and build more hatred for each other instead of the whole concept of unity. Sometimes the media, which has fake news can take things out of context, in result people will have an upsetting reaction.

African Americans use Twitter at a higher rate than their white counterparts with 22 percent of online blacks using the service in 2014 compared to 16 percent of online whites. Hashtags such as #OscarsSoWhite, #handsupdontshoot, and #icantbreathe have sprung up as offshoots in the social movement and have helped create a subculture on the website that some have called "Black Twitter". Jelani Cobb, professor of Journalism at Columbia University, has argued that that "Black Twitter" has been as vital to Black Lives Matter as television was for the Civil Rights Movement.

Citizen reporting on platforms such as Twitter and Facebook help drive the coverage of traditional media on stories of violence, discrimination, and harassment.

==== ALS Ice Bucket Challenge ====
The ALS Ice Bucket Challenge was a form of media activism that swept through online communities to bring awareness to amyotrophic lateral sclerosis, also known as Lou Gehrig's Disease, a fatal disease which causes damage to a person's motor functions through the breakdown of nerve cells. The challenge involves pouring a bucket of cold water over a person's head, and donating to the ALS Association. It began in July 2014, when Chris Kennedy first challenged his sister, Jeanette Senerchia, to participate in the challenge. Senerchia was inspired to partake in order to support her husband who had previously been diagnosed with the disease. Soon the challenge became widespread across mainstream media platforms such as Facebook, Twitter, and Instagram. The challenge picked up a mass following due to the amount of lives touched by the disease and the desire to see progress in the fight against ALS. The accumulation of donations made by supporters of the cause resulted in as much as $115 million being donated to the ALS Association in an effort to find a cure and bring awareness to the cause.

==== Kony 2012 ====
Joseph Kony was the leader of Uganda's Lords Resistance Army (LRA) in 2012. He was accused of abducting over 60,000 Ugandan children, turning the boys into brainwashed killing machines and the young girls into sex slaves. He killed anyone who stood in his way. In 2012, an American charity named "Invisible Children" took Kony's actions and turned them into a short film, posting it on YouTube. It was the fastest growing viral video of all time, receiving over 100 million views in the span of 6 days. Kony had been wanted by the International Criminal Court since 2005 for crimes against humanity. After gaining so much attention from social media sites like YouTube and Twitter, the U.S. finally declares the LRA a terrorist group in 2008. They even sent 100 of their own troops to support Uganda in tracking Kony and taking him down. Hundreds of thousands of people tweeted with the hashtag "#stopkony". The Kony video resulted in never before seen international efforts to end Africa's longest lasting issue. The video incorporated people form all over the world who probably had no idea this problem was occurring otherwise. It proved that if people knew about an issue and were given the opportunity to help, they in fact would. Social justice campaigns have been using new media strategies to communicate to the public. Things like online distribution, podcasts and the new cultural norm of social media have been fused with the traditional rallies, protests and lobbying efforts and have created a new type of change that is somewhat convenient for its followers. These new social platforms have made it possible for the public to be both the consumer and producer of media, making their efforts for change reach numbers of people at never before seen speed, like the Kony video.

==== No Dakota Access Pipeline (#NoDAPL) ====
The Dakota Access Pipeline Protests of 2016 was one the largest, more contemporary, Indigenous protests in the United States where social media played role in raising awareness globally of the Standing Rock Sioux Tribe's concerns with the oil pipeline construction. The protests have been referred to as the NoDAPL movement or the Stand with Standing Rock movement. Social media hashtags associated with the movement included #NoDAPL, #StandwithStandingRock, #Waterislife, and #ReZpectOurWater. During the 2016 movement, more than one million Facebook users checked in to the Standing Rock Sioux Tribe's reservation located near the border of North Dakota and South Dakota along the Missouri River. The Facebook check-in's demonstrated the global reach of the Indigenous movement. On Sunday November 20, 2016, livestreams and videos were circulated through social media platforms that showed evidence of North Dakota law enforcement officers utilizing "pepper spray, teargas, rubber bullets, Tasers, sound weapons, and other "less-than-lethal" weapons" against pipeline protestors who referred to themselves as Water Protectors. During the NoDAPL movement there was a mass mobilization of people who traveled to the confluence of the Missouri River and Cannonball River in North Dakota, where the oil pipeline crosses under the Missouri River, near the border of the Standing Rock Sioux Tribe.

=== Venezuela ===
Social media has been used politically to achieve success during elections, including the 2012 re-election campaign of President Hugo Chávez and the 2013 presidential campaign between Nicolás Maduro and Henrique Capriles Radonski. Social media was used to organize rallies and political platforms and affected campaign content. Opposition candidate Capriles used social media as an activist approach to "drum up" support and connect with voters politically. This form of media activism connected most dominantly in the Venezuelan youth population—a generation considered to be tech-savvy.

On March 14, 2013, Lourdes Alicia Ortega Pérez was imprisoned by the Scientific Penal and Criminal Investigation Corps of Venezuela for tweeting a message that was considered "destabilizing to the country".

=== Fiji ===
Rotuman in Fiji, the Rotuman people are deemed the minority, causing vast outmigration of nearly 80 percent of the population. Digital communication is relied on heavily to conserve the Rotuman culture. The communication aspects of digital media are of great benefit. The use of digital media allows the Rotuman people to remain in touch and conserve their culture.

== Frameworks for the use of media in political movements ==
Scholars have attempted to create theoretical frameworks to illustrate the use of media within social movements and activism.

One example is the four-stage model for political movements using social media created by Rodrigo Sandoval-Almazan and J. Roman Gil-Garcia.

1. Triggering event
2. Media response
3. Viral organization
4. Physical response

Limitations of social media activism have also been pointed out by scholars. Some critics argue that media activism and internet activism still require the coverage of traditional mass media outlets in order to gain significant traction. Social movements, especially ones rooted in online social media, also require a critical mass of participants in order to sustain the presence on social media platforms.

A study of the protests and media activism sparked by the 2009 Iranian presidential election also suggests that digital creations and media have to be emotionally moving in order to spur civic engagement and mobilization of citizens.

== Representation of Indigenous groups ==
Media activism has also provided an opportunity for Indigenous peoples to address issues of local government inadequacy. Through the usage of media technology and online communication, Indigenous groups are able to reach out further than their specific localities and build solidarity with other national minorities who face similar issues. Indigenous groups in the Philippines have been able to use online media to debunk stereotypes propagated in national media and to communicate their causes and claims with an international audience. Media activism also allows indigenous groups to mobilize external support from international allies, especially when local conditions become too dangerous to mobilize locally, due cases of political harassment or extrajudicial killings. Agents of media in terms of activism, are a doubled edged sword which indicate the historic importance, while also laying stepping stones for its significance in the future. Similarly, indigenous life writing is a phenomenon which not only signifies its historic importance but also lays the foundation for the future white settler conception of colonialism and a medium to secure land rights for the indigenous.

Aboriginal and Torres Strait Islander people use social media at higher rates than non-Indigenous Australians. As a form of activism, they use social media and especially memes, to challenge dominant views of Australian history. In a comprehensive study of Aboriginal and Torres Strait Islander social media use, Bronwyn Carlson and Ryan Frazer found that many people experience unpleasant interactions like trolling and racism, but still value social media: "For many, it had become an invaluable tool in the realisation of their hopes and dreams; it helped them 'find' and share their identities and produce intimate communities of mutual trust, respect, care and kindness." Social media is an important tool for developing activists' collective identities.

== Suppression ==
In light of the benefits of media activism, there are those who oppose the usage of it as an organizing tool. One caveat of technology is that those in power can use the internet to track down and target activists. Dominant elites, or those challenged by media activism, have tried to push back by filtering the internet, blocking specific websites, decreasing the connection speeds, and tracking users who view political information.

States such as North Korea, Venezuela, and China have attempted to curtail media activism through a variety of tactics. The Chinese state engages in media censorship in the name of national harmony, although the Council on Foreign Relations argues that suppression of online activism is to protect authorities' political or economic interests. In North Korea, the state curtails virtually all forms of digital communication, but a few transnational citizen-journalists have used technology like cell phones and thumb drives to communicate accurate news to citizens and abroad.

== Criticisms of Media Activism ==
Although media activism is a form of activism it is not a form of high risk activism, more a form of organization through communication. Slacktivism is a term coined to emphasize on the lack of action media activism enrolls, through engaging in the talk of social issues but not reacting. Critics argue that media activism does not seem to be the most efficient engine in taking action towards social regimes, however many recognize it as a powerful tool of communication to connect like-minded populations.

== Organizations ==
- Democracy Now!
- Fairness and Accuracy in Reporting (FAIR)
- Free Press (organization)
- Independent Media Center
- Adbusters

== See also ==
- Alternative media
- Freedom of the press
- Hacktivism
- Internet activism
- Radical media
- Tactical media
