= Steve Gill =

American talk radio host

Steve Gill (born November 15, 1956) is an American conservative talk radio host based and political commentator based in Nashville, Tennessee. He was the co-founder/political editor of the website The Tennessee Star prior to his August 2019 resignation. Currently involved in TV and radio commentary both in the U.S. and internationally, he is a regular commentator on radio stations in Memphis (KWAM), Jackson, TN and Washington DC, and television commentary for Bloomberg Dubai, RT Moscow, WZTV Nashville, GB News, and TalkTV, among others. In 2019, Gill was arrested for not paying $170,000 in back child support.

== Education ==
Gill attended the University of Tennessee, where he received an undergraduate degree in history and a J.D. degree. He played varsity basketball while in college and was a member of the 1977 Tennessee team that won the Southeastern Conference championship. As a student, he was also president of the student body, president of Omicron Delta Kappa, and student member of the university board of trustees. Gill was an adjunct faculty member at Belmont University from 1991 to 2004, teaching graduate and undergraduate courses in international business, business law, and negotiations.

== Political career ==
In 1992 Gill was appointed to a White House Fellowship by President George H. W. Bush. During his fellowship year he served as Director of Intergovernmental Affairs for the U.S. Trade Representative in the Executive Office of the President under both the Bush and Clinton Administrations.

In 1994 and 1996 Gill was the Republican nominee against longtime Sixth District U.S. Representative Bart Gordon, barely losing in 1994 and again in 1996, being outspent each election by over $1 million. One of the statements used against him during the campaigns was in response to a push to increase the minimum wage. Video was shown in which he noted the logistical and economic problems with a national minimum wage setting payments in both New York City and rural Tennessee, "Five dollars an hour goes a lot farther down here."

Gill was the morning host on 99.7 FM WWTN, leaving the air on June 30, 2006. On July 31, 2006, Nashville radio station WLAC 1510 AM announced Gill's return to the station, with a program to air Saturday mornings on WLAC and a number of other stations in the state of Tennessee starting August 12, 2006. Since 2009, Radio America has handled syndication. WLAC also announced plans to begin airing a weekday morning show hosted by Gill on October 2, 2006. Gill began his talk radio career on WLAC.

Starting January 1, 2010, Steve Gill's flagship station, WLAC, underwent a major lineup change to take advantage of the increasingly popular nationally syndicated shows of Glenn Beck and Mark Levin. Mr. Beck, whose show previously occupied the 5PM–8PM (tape delayed) timeslot was moved to Gill's 8AM–11AM slot. Gill moved into the 5AM–8AM morning drive slot and in 2011 the station dropped an hour of Beck and added an additional hour for the Gill Show from 8–9 am. Gill's show aired live in Nashville Monday – Friday from 5–9 am CST. The Steve Gill Show also aired live Monday–Friday on 87.7 fm/1210 am WMPS "The Point" in Memphis, WJZM 1400 am in Clarksville, and WHUB 1400 am in Cookeville. Mark Levin now occupied Beck's old 5PM–8PM slot and was live.

The Steve Gill Show ended in 2013. Gill returned to the air in 2018 on WETR Knoxville with a 30-minute show, The Gill Report.

Gill was the owner of The Tennessee Star, a conservative news website covering the state. The Tennessee Star is part of The Star News Digital Media network which includes: The Ohio Star, The Minnesota Sun, The Michigan Star, and Battleground State News. The use of "Sun" in Minnesota may be to avoid confusion and legal problems with the Star Tribune, the largest paper in the state.

On August 25, 2019, Gill was arrested and jailed for contempt of court when he failed to appear at a civil hearing regarding $170,000 in unpaid child support. Following this arrest, he resigned as the Tennessee Star's political editor and from its Board of Directors on August 26, 2019. His resignation announcement has since been removed from the Star's website.

He interviewed many Washington figures on his shows, including Vice President Dick Cheney and Secretary of Defense Donald Rumsfeld. Other guests have included former Presidents Bill Clinton and Jimmy Carter, former Secretaries of State Henry Kissinger and Condoleezza Rice, numerous Senators, Members of Congress, Governors and Cabinet officials. Actors and entertainers like Charlie Daniels, John Rich, Trace Adkins, Brad Paisley, Lou Diamond Phillips, Kyle Chandler, Teri Hatcher, Janine Turner, Fred Thompson, Gene Simmons, and Gene Hackman had also made appearances on the show.

His book about the potential presidential campaign of Fred Thompson, The Fred Factor: How Fred Thompson May Change the Face of the '08 Election, (ISBN 0976873710) was released on May 25, 2007.

In 2000 and 2001 Gill was instrumental in leading an effective protest against a state income tax. At his urging, anti-tax protesters deluged legislators with phone calls and e-mails, and circled the state capitol building in cars and trucks, continually honking their horns. Americans for Tax Reform recognized Gill with a "Hero of the Taxpayers" award for these actions. However, there also was criticism for the tactics used, which resulted in broken windows and other damage at the capitol, requiring state police to barricade and patrol the capitol to protect legislators, and led to several legislators being taken from the capitol building by ambulance to be hospitalized for cardiac problems.

== Personal life ==
Gill lives in Brentwood, Tennessee, and has two adult sons.

On August 25, 2019, Gill was found in contempt of court and booked into the Williamson County jail in Tennessee for 10 days after not appearing or sending legal representation for a scheduled civil hearing. The dispute was regarding $170,000 in outstanding child support to his ex-wife, Kathryn Gill, for college tuition and other expenses related to their adult sons. Gill's second wife, Dana, filed for a divorce and an order of protection against him on August 22, 2019. The petition for an order of protection was dismissed by the Court and was not re-filed.

In a 23-page order Gill's wife said he was physically and verbally abusive, threatened his power and influence against her. "Steve has pushed me, grabbed me. He liked to block me in the shower when I am nude, screaming at me, intimidating me, calling me disgusting names," she wrote. The allegations remain unproven and, given the court's dismissal, are legally deemed unsubstantiated.

== See also ==
- Tennessee Tax Revolt
