= Åsa Wettergren =

Sociologist

Åsa Wettergren (born 1969) is an associate professor in the Department of Sociology at the University of Gothenburg. Her research interests include social movements, migration, processes of identification and change in organization and society, and the sociology of emotions.

== Education ==
- Ph.D. from Karlstad University, 2005

== Notable publications ==
- Wettergren, Å., "Like Moths to a Flame: Culture Jamming and the Global Spectacle"
- Fun and Laughter: Culture Jamming & the Emotional Regime of Late Capitalism
