= The Tennessee Star =

Conservative news website in Tennessee, United States

The Tennessee Star is a conservative news and commentary website founded in 2017 and based in Franklin, Tennessee. It was cofounded by talk show host Steve Gill, and is part of a network of similar websites in multiple states.

The Tennessee Star was launched on February 6, 2017, by Steve Gill, Michael Patrick Leahy, and Christina Botteri, all of whom were supporters of the Tea Party movement. The trio went on to found similar publications in other states, which were consolidated into Star News Digital Media, Inc.

The publication has been compared to Breitbart, which Leahy also writes for, as well as NewBostonPost. It is partially funded by multiple influential Republican donors. Despite this, The Tennessee Star claims to be neutral. Neil W. McCabe, formerly Washington bureau chief of One America News Network, serves as the publication's national political correspondent.
