= Chris Atton =

British academic (born 1959)

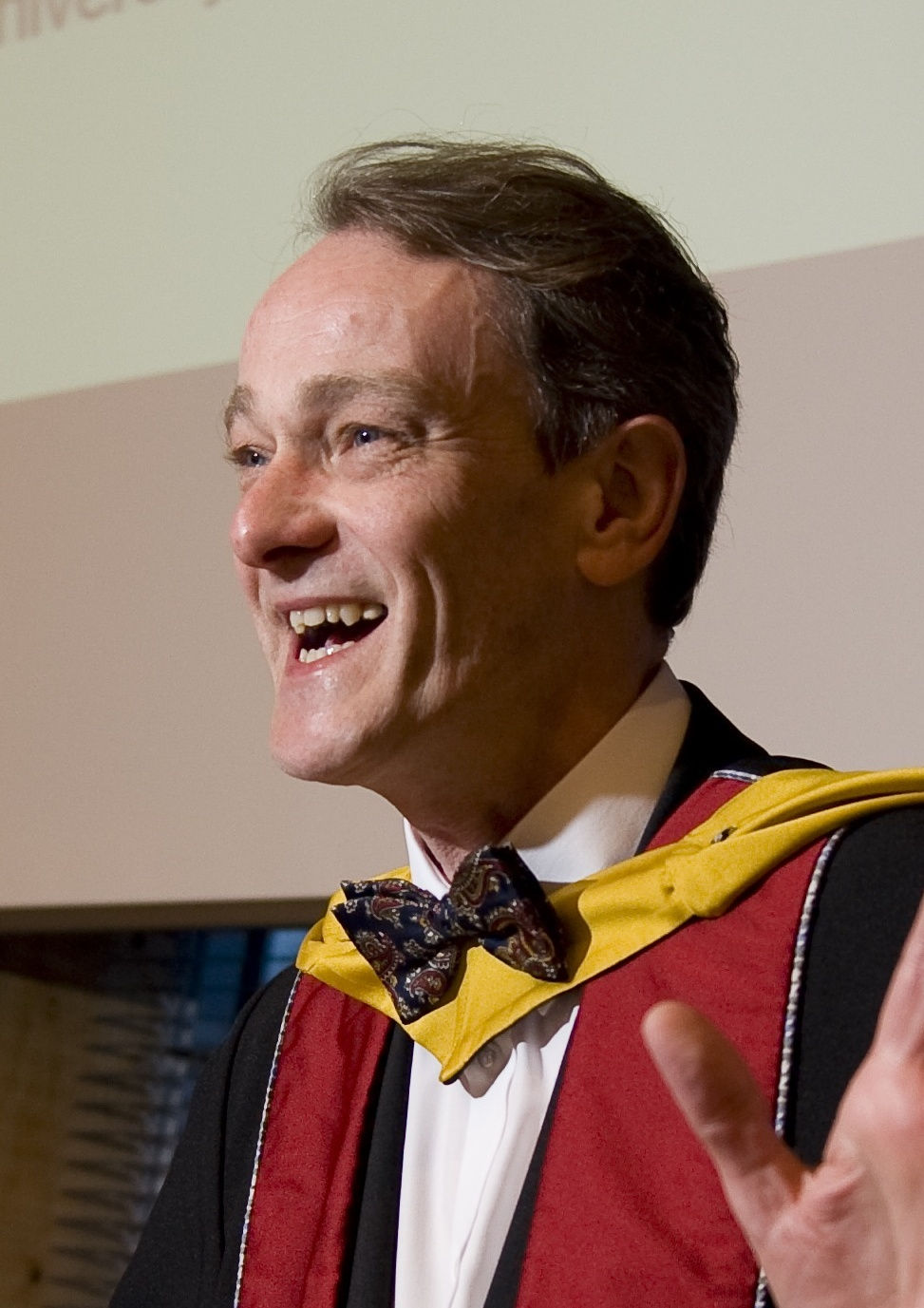
- Professorial lecture, 2009
- Born: Christopher Frank Atton; 10 March 1959 (age 67); Rotherham, Yorkshire, England
- Occupation: University professor
- Spouse: Susan Atton

Christopher Frank Atton (born 10 March 1959) is a British academic. He is a retired Professor of Media and Culture in the School of Arts and Creative Industries at Edinburgh Napier University. His work focuses on Alternative Media where his contribution has concentrated on the notion of alternative media not as an essentialised political position but as a set of socio-cultural processes that redraw the boundaries of expert culture and media power. His research interests include popular music, the creative economy, infoshops, and teaching and learning in higher education. Atton has also written on censorship and media ethics.

== Education ==
Atton was awarded his PhD in 1999 with a study of the British alternative press; he also holds an MA (Hons) in Latin Studies from the University of Edinburgh and an MA in Mass Communications from the University of Leicester.

== Academic career ==
Atton started academic life as a translator of Renaissance Latin texts before training as a librarian in Leeds in 1985. After several years working in public and college libraries, he was appointed Science Librarian at Edinburgh Napier University in 1992. He was made a Fellow of the Library Association (UK) in 1995 and received the American Library Association's Jackie Eubanks Memorial Award 'in recognition of outstanding achievements in promoting alternative media in libraries' in 1998. Following posts as Lecturer and Reader, Atton was conferred with Fellowship of the Higher Education Academy in 2007 and appointed Professor in the School of Arts and Creative Industries in October 2008. He was appointed to membership of the Arts and Humanities Research Council's Peer Review College in 2010.

== Scholarship ==
Books

- Alternative Journalism (Sage, 2008, with James F. Hamilton)
- An Alternative Internet (Edinburgh University Press, 2004)
- Alternative Media (Sage, 2002)
- Alternative Literature (Gower, 1996)
- The Kabbalistic Diagrams of Rosenroth (Christian Knorr von Rosenroth) (Hermetic Research Trust, 1987) (co-translator: Stephen Dziklewicz)

Selected articles

- 'Popular Music Fanzines: Genre, Aesthetics and the "Democratic Conversation"', Popular Music and Society 33(4), 2010: 517–531
- 'Writing about Listening: Alternative Discourses in Rock Journalism', Popular Music 28(1), 2009: 53–67
- 'Current Issues in Alternative Media Research', Sociology Compass 1(1), 2007: 17–27
- 'Far-right Media on the Internet: Culture, Discourse and Power', New Media and Society 8(4), 2006: 573–587
- 'News Cultures and New Social Movements: Radical Journalism and the Mainstream Media', Journalism Studies 3(4), November 2002: 491–505
- 'Living in the Past?: Value Discourses in Progressive Rock Fanzines', Popular Music 20 (1), January 2001: 29–46
- 'A Re-assessment of the Alternative Press', Media, Culture and Society 21(1), January 1999: 51–76
- 'The librarian as ethnographer: notes towards a strategy for the exploitation of cultural collections', Collection Building 17(4), 1998: 154–158
- 'Anarchy on the Internet: Obstacles and Opportunities for Alternative Electronic Publishing', Anarchist Studies 4(2), October 1996: 115–132
- 'The Consideratio Brevis of Philip à Gabella', The Hermetic Journal, 1989: 79–97 (translator)

Edited volumes

- Journalism: Theory, Practice, Criticism: 'New Media and Journalism Practice in Africa', 12(3), August 2011 (co-editor: Hayes Mabweazara)
- Scan: Journal of Media Arts Culture: 'News and the Net: Convergences and Divergences', 3(1), June 2006
- Media, Culture and Society; 'Alternative Media', 25(5), September 2003 (co-editor: Nick Couldry)
- Journalism: Theory, Practice, Criticism: 'What is "Alternative Journalism?', 4(3), August 2003

Other A full list of book chapters, encyclopaedia entries, peer reviewed articles, keynote addresses, public lectures, conference and other items is held at the Edinburgh Napier University Repository.

== Music ==
Atton has been a music critic and performer for thirty years, specialising in electronic, improvised and traditional musics. He has been a member of the live electronics group Certain Ants since its formation.
