= Right-wing alternative media in the United States =

Conservative journalism

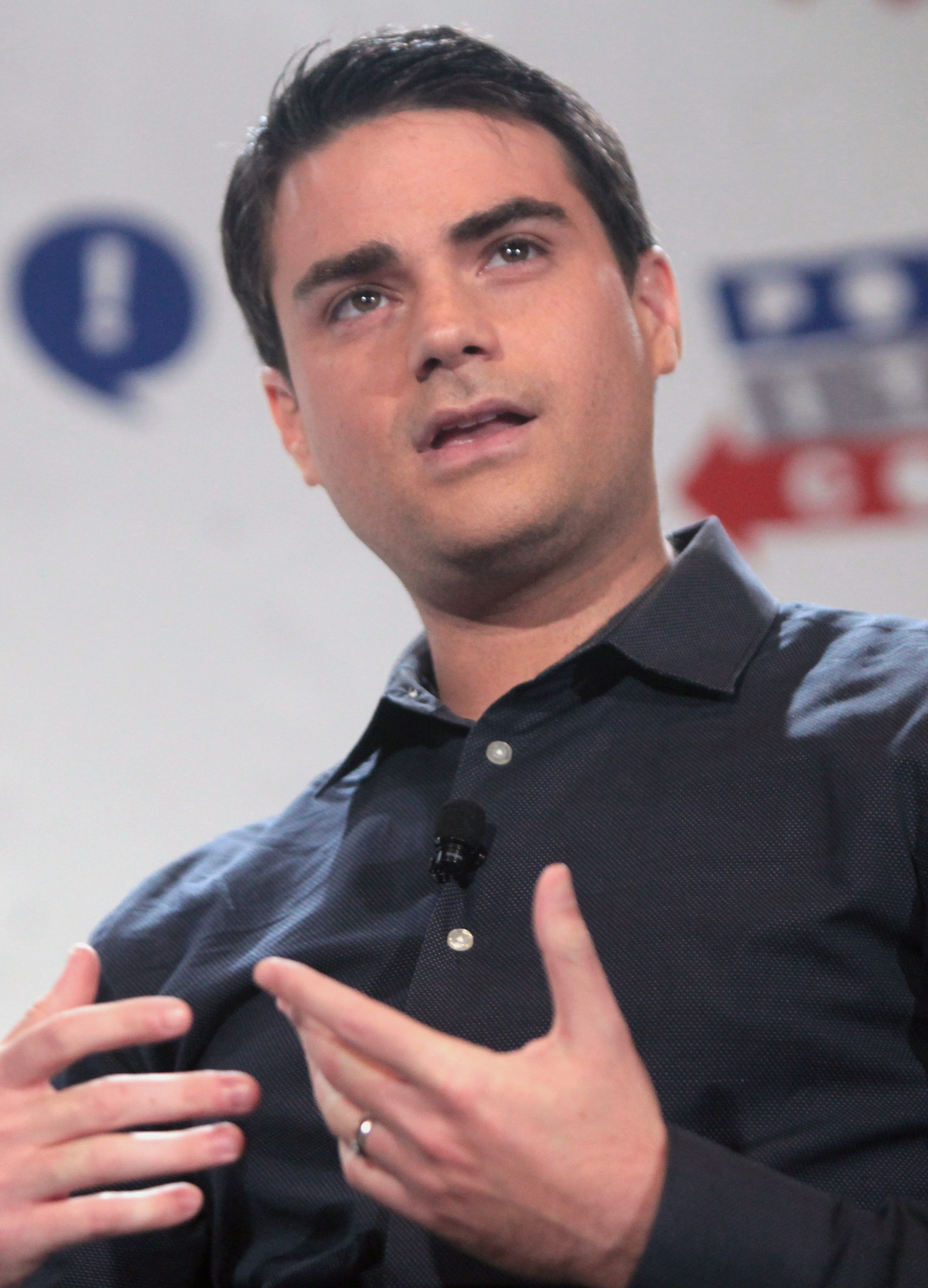
Ben Shapiro, founder of The Daily Wire, one of the largest conservative websites in the United States

The term right-wing alternative media in the United States usually refers to internet, talk radio, print, and television journalism. They are defined by their presentation of opinions from a conservative or right wing point of view and politicized reporting as a counter to what they describe as a liberal bias of mainstream media.

== History ==
=== Before the 1960s ===
During this time, some prominent mainstream newspapers were conservative. William Randolph Hearst, longtime Progressive Democrat, turned increasingly conservative since the 1920s. He initially supported President Franklin D. Roosevelt's New Deal, but broke with him after 1934. Since then, the Hearst chain newspapers opposed the New Deal. Among other prominent newspapers, Los Angeles Times remained staunchly conservative until 1952. During the 1960s, it turned decisively liberal. McCormick family newspapers (particularly the Chicago Tribune) remained staunchly conservative until the late 1960s, as were the Henry Luce magazines like Time and Fortune. By 1936, most newspapers opposed the New Deal. In that year, newspapers in the largest 15 metropolitan cities with 70% circulation supported the Republican candidate Alf Landon against FDR.

At the same time, conservative activists began to found their own magazines to counter perceived liberal bias in mainstream media and to propagate their conservative point of view. Human Events was founded in 1944 by The Washington Post former editor Felix Morley and publisher Henry Regnery. Libertarian, pro-free market journal The Freeman was founded in 1950 by journalists John Chamberlain, Henry Hazlitt, and Suzanne La Follette. Many conservative intellectuals were associated with it, who later joined the National Review.

In 1955, National Review was founded by the author and journalist William F. Buckley Jr. Its publisher was William A. Rusher. Since its inception, National Review became the beacon of post-war conservative movement. Buckley drew conservative (particularly ex-communist) intellectuals to the magazine, including Russell Kirk, Frank Meyer, Whittaker Chambers, L. Brent Bozell Jr., John Dos Passos, James Burnham, and William Schlamm. Meyer formed the new thesis of fusionism, which included a fusion of traditionalism, libertarianism, and anti-communism. This became the guiding philosophy of the New Right.

These decades also saw the emergence of conservative talk radio, though their outreach was more limited and more balanced than that of recent decades, due to the Fairness Doctrine. Among pioneering conservative talk radio hosts were Fulton Lewis, Paul Harvey, Bob Grant, Alan Burke, and Clarence Manion, former dean of the Notre Dame Law School.

=== 1960s to 1980s ===
Not long after the aforementioned developments, then Vice President Spiro Agnew began attacking the media in a series of speeches as "elitist" and "liberal" — two of the most famous of these were written by Nixon's White House aides Patrick Buchanan and William Safire. After Nixon's resignation and until the late 1980s, overtly conservative news outlets included the editorial pages of The Wall Street Journal, the Chicago Tribune, the New York Post and The Washington Times. Conservative magazines included the National Review, The Weekly Standard and the American Spectator.

=== Fairness doctrine ===
The fairness doctrine of the United States Federal Communications Commission (FCC), introduced in 1949, was a policy that required the holders of broadcast licenses both to present controversial issues of public importance and to do so in a manner that fairly reflected differing viewpoints. In 1987, the FCC abolished the fairness doctrine, prompting some to urge its reintroduction through either Commission policy or congressional legislation. The FCC removed the rule that implemented the policy from the Federal Register in August 2011.

The fairness doctrine had two basic elements: It required broadcasters to devote some of their airtime to discussing controversial matters of public interest, and to air contrasting views regarding those matters. Stations were given wide latitude as to how to provide contrasting views: It could be done through news segments, public affairs shows, or editorials. The doctrine did not require equal time for opposing views but required that contrasting viewpoints be presented. The demise of this FCC rule has been cited as a contributing factor in the rising level of political polarization in the United States.

While the original purpose of the doctrine was to ensure that viewers were exposed to a diversity of viewpoints, it was used by the Kennedy, Johnson, and Nixon administrations to combat political opponents operating on talk radio and television. In Red Lion Broadcasting Co. v. FCC (1969), the United States Supreme Court upheld the FCC's general right to enforce the fairness doctrine where channels were limited; however, the court did not rule that the FCC was obliged to do so. The courts reasoned that the scarcity of the broadcast spectrum, which limited the opportunity for access to the airwaves, created a need for the doctrine. The fairness doctrine is not the same as the equal-time rule, which is still in place. The fairness doctrine deals with discussion of controversial issues, while the equal-time rule deals only with political candidates.

=== Contemporary right-wing media ===
Journalist Ezra Klein describes right-wing media in the late 20th and early 21st century as evolving and growing in influence:

First came Rush Limbaugh and his imitators on talk radio, then Fox News (and eventually its imitators and competitors, like OANN), and then the blogs, and then digitally native outlets like Breitbart and the Daily Wire.

Right-wing media represented and was nurtured by the party's grass-roots base—as opposed to "the donor class" or "the Chamber of Commerce wing" of the Republican Party (such as the Koch network). Nicole Hemmer describes the Republican Party as having "outsourced" its media to the right-wing media just as “it outsourced funding to PACS”. American right-wing "media ecosystem" became characterized by ruthless competition—if one outlet lost "touch with what the audience actually cares about", that audience would move on "to another show, another station, another site".

The new media was the place where grass-roots discontent with "the Republican Party’s leadership or agenda could be turned against the party’s elite", and where party rebel candidates could raise money "even after they alienated their colleagues and repelled the Koch class", (an example being Marjorie Taylor Greene, who was one of the 10 top fund-raisers in the House of Representatives in the 2022 election cycle.) Research indicates that Republican members of Congress engage with alternative news media online and suggests those who do have become increasingly radical in recent years.

=== Talk radio ===
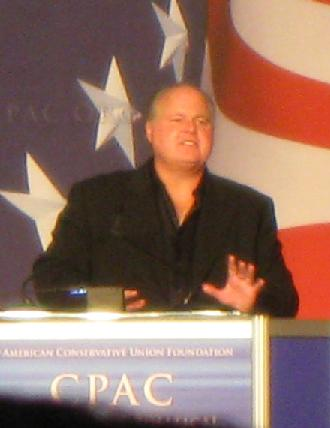
Rush Limbaugh, nationally syndicated radio host

With the increased popularity and superior sound quality of FM radio, AM stations had long languished behind FM in both popularity and ratings, resulting in underutilization of the band. There had even been discussions in the 1970s and 1980s of abolishing the AM band.

The combination of underutilized AM frequencies and the absence of content restrictions led a number of radio programmers and syndicators to produce and broadcast conservative talk shows. Notable examples are Rush Limbaugh, Hugh Hewitt, Michael Medved, Michael Savage, Sean Hannity and Glenn Beck. These talk shows draw large audiences and have arguably altered the political landscape. Talk radio became a key force in the 2000 and 2004 presidential elections. While some liberal talk radio also emerged, such as Pacifica Radio's Democracy Now! and the ersatz Air America Radio, most liberal voices have moved to the Internet, leaving broadcast radio still dominated by conservatives.

=== Blogs ===
In the early 2000s, blogs of all political persuasions became increasingly influential. Conservative blogs such as Power Line, Captains Quarters and blogger Michelle Malkin covered and promoted a number of stories, for instance the Swift Boat Veterans' criticism of the war record of presidential candidate John Kerry. Particularly notable was the uncovering of the "Memogate" scandal by Little Green Footballs and others.

American blog Captains Quarters played a role in the 2004 Canadian election, outflanking a Canadian judicial gag order on media coverage of hearings related to a Liberal Party of Canada corruption scandal. The fallout from the scandal helped lead to a Conservative Party victory in the following election.

=== 2010s ===
In October 2020, describing the ascendancy of alternative media on the right of American politics during the late 2010s, journalist Ben Smith wrote:

By 2015, the old gatekeepers had entered a kind of crisis of confidence, believing they couldn't control the online news cycle any better than King Canute could control the tides. Television networks all but let Donald Trump take over as executive producer that summer and fall. In October 2016, Julian Assange and James Comey seemed to drive the news cycle more than the major news organizations. Many figures in old media and new bought into the idea that in the new world, readers would find the information they wanted to read — and therefore, decisions by editors and producers, about whether to cover something and how much attention to give it, didn't mean much.

There was also an emergence of state-specific right-wing alternative media news websites that emerged in the decade such as The Tennessee Star, NewBostonPost, and others.

== List of media ==
- Infowars
- One America News Network (OANN)
- The Daily Wire
  - The Ben Shapiro Show
- Newsmax
- War Room
- The Daily Caller
- Breitbart News
- The Epoch Times
- The Post Millennial
- Rumble (video platform)
  - America First with Nicholas J. Fuentes
- Blaze Media
- The Free Press
- The Tucker Carlson Show
- Candace
- Libs of TikTok

== See also ==
- Alt-tech
- Alt-right
- Alt-right pipeline
- New media
- Digital media
- Online news media
- Blogosphere
- Conservative talk radio
- MAGA movement
- Far-right politics in the United States
- Mainstream media
- Left-wing alternative media in the United States
