= Jacqueline Eubanks =

American librarian and activist (1938–1992)

Jacqueline (Jackie) Eubanks (1938–1992) was an activist and reference librarian at Brooklyn College who advocated for alternative publishing venues and who spoke out about institutional marginalization and discrimination. Eubanks was an active member of the American Library Association (ALA) and a founding member of the ALA Social Responsibilities Roundtable. As a proponent of alternative press and radical, counter-mainstream publications, Eubanks founded Alternatives in Print (also known as the Alternative Press Index) that served to document books, pamphlets, periodicals, and other materials not easily found in other indices. The initial reception to Alternatives in Print by librarians was mixed and some members of the ALA were bothered by the fact that people outside of the library community helped contribute to the index.

Eubanks' efforts helped to revolutionize collection development and since 1995 a memorial award named for her and sponsored by the Alternatives in Publication Task Force of the ALA Social Responsibilities Round Table has been given to librarians who collect and use alternative materials at their institutions. During a time where publishing environments were static and library acquisition processes were entrenched, Eubanks believed that library schools had a responsibility to educate students about publishing and introduce prospective librarians to non-mainstream publications.
