= Left-wing alternative media in the United States =

This is a list of alternative media supporting the views of the American political left. It covers alternative media sources including talk radio programs, TV shows, podcasts, investigative journalism, documentaries, blogs and other alternative media sources.

== List of media ==
=== News services ===
- AlterNet
- The American Prospect
- Common Dreams
- Consortium News
- Current Affairs
- Daily Kos
- Democracy Now!
- Free Speech TV
- The Empire Files
- The Grayzone
- In These Times
- Indymedia
- The Intercept
- Jacobin
- The Lever (headed by David Sirota, formerly The Daily Poster)
- The Majority Report with Sam Seder
- MintPress News
- The Nation
- The New Republic
- OpEdNews
- The Raw Story
- The Real News
- The Progressive
- Redneck Revolt
- Reveal News
- ShadowProof
- Status Coup
- Truthdig
- Truthout
- US Uncut
- World Socialist Web Site
- Zeteo
- ZNetwork

=== Television channels and networks ===
- Current TV
- Free Speech TV
- Link TV
- Means TV
- The Real News Network

=== Television programs ===
- Last Week Tonight with John Oliver
- Democracy Now!
- Lee Camp (comedian)
- The Majority Report
- Secular Talk

=== Radio programs and podcasts ===
- ACLU podcast
- Air America
- Chapo Trap House
- Current Affairs (podcast)
- Common Censored
- CounterSpin (radio program) by FAIR
- Democracy Now!
- The Empire Files
- Freethought Radio
- Hasan Piker
- Humanist Report
- Thom Hartmann Program
- The Intercept - Podcasts & Spoken Edition
- Kyle Kulinski
- The Majority Report with Sam Seder
- Media Roots Radio
- MeidasTouch Network
- Mintcast
- Pacifica Radio
- Ring of Fire
- SiriusXM Progress satellite radio
- Some More News
- The West Wing Thing

=== Publications ===
- AlterNet, edited by Roxanne Cooper, acquired by The Raw Story
- The American Prospect, monthly, established 1990. Circulation 55,000.
- The Baffler, established 1988.
- CounterPunch, established 1993.
- Current Affairs, bimonthly, established 2015.
- Dissent, quarterly, established 1954.
- Dollars & Sense, bimonthly, established 1974.
- Fifth Estate, quarterly, established 1965.
- Freedom Socialist, bimonthly, established 1976.
- In These Times, monthly, established 1976. Circulation 17,000.
- Indy Week
- The Indypendent, published 17 times per year, established 2000.
- Jacobin, established 2010.
- Labor Notes, monthly, established 1979.
- Left Turn, quarterly.
- Liberation News, official newspaper of The Party for Socialism and Liberation
- Monthly Review, monthly, established 1949. Circulation 7,000.
- Mother Jones, bimonthly, established 1974.
- The Nation, weekly, established 1865. Circulation 190,000.
- The New Hampshire Gazette, fortnightly, press run 5,500.
- New Politics (magazine), semiannually, established 1986.
- People's World, official newspaper of The CPUSA, est. 1924
- The Progressive, monthly, established 1909.
- Review of Radical Political Economics, quarterly, established 1968.
- Revolution, official newspaper of the Revolutionary Communist Party USA, est. 1979
- The Socialist, official publication of Socialist Party USA
- Socialist Appeal, English-language Trotskyist newspaper, International Marxist Tendency
- Texas Observer, established 1954.
- Utne Reader, bimonthly, established 1984. Circulation 150,000.
- Z Magazine, monthly established 1977.

== See also ==
- Right-wing alternative media in the United States
- Alternative press (disambiguation)
- American Left
- Breadtube
- Progressive talk radio
- Underground press
