= Sol Worth =

- Born: Sol Wishnepolsky; August 19, 1922; New York City
- Died: August 29, 1977 (aged 55); Andover, Massachusetts

Academic background
- Education: State University of Iowa

Academic work
- Discipline: Anthropology; Communications
- Sub-discipline: Visual communication
- Institutions: Annenberg School of Communications

Sol Worth (August 19, 1922 in New York City – August 29, 1977) was a painter, photography and visual communication scholar.

== Biography ==
Worth's parents, Ida and Jacob Wishnepolsky, were Russian immigrants who worked in the garment industry and were active members of the International Ladies' Garment Workers' Union. His first language was Yiddish, and he spoke virtually no English until he began school at age 5. Worth attended the founding class of the High School of Music and Art in New York City as an art student from 1936 until 1940; in 1937 one of his paintings was chosen to be part of a student exhibition at the Museum of Modern Art. Upon graduation from high school he attended the State University of Iowa, where he studied with the painter Philip Guston. He graduated in 1943 with a Bachelor of Fine Arts in painting, but entered the Navy before graduation and did not formally receive his diploma until already on board the USS Missouri in the Pacific. While in the Navy, Worth served as helmsman on the Missouri and was later assigned to Military Intelligence at the Joint Intelligence Center in Hawaii.

In October 1945, Worth returned to New York City to marry Tobia Lessler, his college sweetheart. Their daughter, Debora M. Worth, was born in May, 1950. Worth remained in New York City on inactive duty with the Navy until 1946, when he received an honorable discharge from the service. Deciding not to accept a graduate assistantship in painting at Iowa, he instead accepted a position as photographer and filmmaker at a commercial art studio, Goold Studios, in Manhattan. In the same year, Sol Wishnepolsky officially changed his name to Sol Worth. Worth worked in the same firm for over seventeen years, eventually becoming vice-president and creative director. From 1948 to 1950 he studied at the New School for Social Research, where he took courses in film production, film animation, and film editing.

In 1956 Worth was awarded a one-year Fulbright Lecturership as visiting professor of documentary film and photography at the University of Helsinki in Finland. Here he produced the documentary film Teatteri, which was later chosen for the permanent film collection of the Museum of Modern Art in New York City. The film, which won awards at the Berlin and Cannes Film Festivals in 1957 and 1958, brought Worth to the attention of Gilbert Seldes, founding dean of the Annenberg School for Communication at the University of Pennsylvania. Worth served as consultant to Seldes until accepting a visiting lectureship at the Annenberg School in 1960. While working at both Penn and Goold Studios, Worth created and was named director of the Documentary Film Laboratory and supervisor of Media Laboratories at the Annenberg School.

In 1964, Worth decided to devote himself entirely to teaching and research in visual communication, and moved to Philadelphia to take a full-time position as assistant professor of communications at the Annenberg School for Communication at the University of Pennsylvania. In 1966, Worth was promoted to associate professor and director of the Media Laboratories, and in 1973 he was named professor of communication and education. In 1971 Penn awarded him an M.A. Honoris Causa. In 1976, Worth created the Undergraduate Major in Communications at Penn, and was appointed the first chair of the new major.

Worth's promotions recognized the outstanding research and scholarship that he had undertaken while at Penn. In 1966 he received a National Science Foundation grant for a study with Navajo Indians through which he expanded his ideas about bio-documentary film, a concept that he had pioneered as early as 1964 in a paper at a meeting of the Society for Applied Anthropology. This project, a study of cross-cultural communication, instructed a group of Navajo on the Pine Springs Reservation in Arizona in the art of filmmaking, and led to the publication in 1972 of his book Through Navajo Eyes: An Exploration in Film Communication and Anthropology, co-authored by the anthropologist John Adair. In 1967 Worth received the Wenner-Gren Foundation award for outstanding research in communication and anthropology. From 1968 to 1972 Worth also held a Visiting Research Professorship at the Mount Sinai School of Medicine in New York City, where he worked with the Department of Community Medicine to develop a bio-documentary teaching unit to enable doctors, medical students, patients, and members of the community to present themselves and their world on film. In 1972, sponsored by the National Science Foundation, Worth organized and taught (together with Jay Ruby, Carroll Williams, and Karl Heider) a summer institute which took selected doctoral students and young faculty in the social sciences and helped them to learn how to use the visual media of still photography, motion pictures, and television for research and communication. The result of this institute was the formation of the first professional organization for visual anthropology, The Society For The Anthropology of Visual Communication. Worth served as president from 1972 to 1974. The first scholarly journal in this field, Studies in the Anthropology of Visual Communication, also grew out of the institute. Worth served as its editor until his death in 1977.

As the author of over two dozen scholarly papers, Worth was recognized in the fields of anthropology and communications well beyond his own sub-field of visual communication. He was actively involved with the American Anthropological Association, the American Film Institute, and the International Film Seminars, as well as the National Endowment for the Humanities, the National Science Foundation, and the Smithsonian Institution. In 1970, along with the anthropologist Margaret Mead and others, he founded the Anthropological Film Research Institute to support the Smithsonian's development of an anthropological film archive. He was chair of the Research Division of the University Film Association, and served as the senior member of the board of directors for the Society of Cinematologists from 1967 through 1970. Worth also served on the founding board of directors of the Semiotic Society of America and on the editorial board of the Journal of Communication.

Worth was attending the Flaherty Film Seminar in Andover, Massachusetts, when he died peacefully in his sleep of a heart attack on August 29, 1977, at the age of fifty-five. In the weeks before his death, Worth had been preparing a proposal to the Guggenheim Foundation and other granting agencies for support for a year of research and thought in which to articulate fully a theory of visual communication as applied to visual events, and to produce the first reader in visual communication. This theoretical effort was to serve as foundation for his next large empirical project, a collaborative effort with Jay Ruby and several of his students: a visual ethnography of an entire community.

== Notable students ==
- Robert Aibel
- Chris Musello
