= John D. H. Downing =

American communications scholar

John D. H. Downing is a communications scholar who has written extensively on Alternative Media and Social Movements. He is Professor Emeritus of International Communication at the College of Mass Communication & Media Arts, Southern Illinois University and currently affiliated with Northwestern University in Qatar. He is founding Director of the Global Media Research Center.

== Education ==
- Ph.D. at London School of Economics and Political Science, 1974. Thesis title: Some aspects of the presentation of industrial relations and race relations in some major British news media
- MSc Econ at London School of Economics and Political Science, 1968
- MA at Oxford University, 1968

== Notable publications ==
- 1996 Internationalizing Media Theory: transition, power, culture: reflections on Russia, Poland and Hungary 1980-95. Sage, London, UK.
- 2001 (with Tamara Villarreal Ford, Genève Gil, Laura Stein): Radical Media: Rebellious Communication and Social Movements. Sage, Thousand Oaks, California.
- 2010 Editor, Sage Encyclopedia of Social Movement Media, Sage, Thousand Oaks, CA.
