= Rodney Benson =

American sociologist

Rodney Benson is an American sociologist and professor of media, culture, and communication at New York University. He is also an affiliated faculty member in the NYU Department of Sociology and has been a visiting scholar or invited lecturer at universities in France (Institut d'etudes politiques, Toulouse; Ecole des hautes etudes en sciences sociales and CELSA-Sorbonne, Paris), Germany (Universities of Bremen, Munich, and Weimar), Denmark (Copenhagen Business School, Roskilde University), Finland (University of Helsinki), and Norway (Universities of Oslo and Bergen). Before joining the NYU faculty, he was an assistant professor of international communications and sociology at the American University of Paris. He holds a PhD in sociology from the University of California, Berkeley.

== Work ==
Benson is a leading scholar of comparative news media systems, specializing in studies of journalism in the U.S., France, Norway, Denmark, and Sweden. His most recent book Shaping Immigration News: A French-American Comparison (Cambridge University Press, 2013) offers a comprehensive portrait of French and American journalists in action as they grapple with how to report on the topic of immigration. Shaping Immigration News is winner of the 2014 Tankard Book Award from the Association for Education in Journalism and Mass Communication and the 2015 Sage International Journal of Press/Politics Book Award. He also has written extensively about cultural globalization, the production of culture, alternative media, logics of media ownership, and the social theories of Pierre Bourdieu and Jürgen Habermas.

In 2011, Benson co-authored (with Matthew Powers) the policy report Public Media and Political Independence: Lessons for the Future of Journalism from Around the World (Free Press).

He is the co-editor, with Erik Neveu, of Bourdieu and the Journalistic Field (Cambridge, UK: Polity, 2005), a widely cited book that helped introduce the work of Pierre Bourdieu to media and communications research. Goldsmith's-University of London professor Nick Couldry wrote of the book: "Media research inspired by field theory, when at its most original (as represented by many essays in this fine volume), is an indispensable tool for understanding [many aspects of contemporary media]: we are all in Benson and Neveu's debt for putting this tool into wider circulation.". In spring 2017, Bourdieu and the Journalistic Field was translated into Chinese.

Benson is on the editorial board of several leading sociological and communication journals, including Poetics and the International Journal of Press/Politics. His comparative media research has been featured in the Columbia Journalism Review, on Jay Rosen's Pressthink blog and on the website of the media reform organization Free Press.

Benson is a frequent contributor to Le Monde diplomatique, writing on U.S. and French media and politics.

Benson received a "Top Paper" award at the International Communication Association's annual conference in 2005 for a comparative study of the French and U.S. press (co-authored with UC-San Diego political scientist Dan Hallin, and subsequently published in the European Journal of Communication). Benson is the recipient of a major research grant from the Axel and Margaret Ax:son Johnson Foundation to support study of forms of media ownership in the U.S., France, and Sweden.

== Education ==
- Ph.D. Sociology at UC-Berkeley, 2000
- MA Sociology at UC-Berkeley, 1994
- MIA International Affairs at Columbia University, 1994
- BA Journalism and Mass Communications Iowa State University, 1983

== Notable publications ==
- Shaping Immigration News: A French-American Comparison (Cambridge University Press, 2013)
- (with Matthew Powers) Public Media and Political Independence (Washington, DC: Free Press, 2011)
- "Quarante ans d'immigration dans les médias en France et aux Etats-Unis." Le Monde Diplomatique, May 2015. view
- "Commercialism and Critique: California's Alternative Weeklies." In J. Curran and N. Couldry, eds., Contesting Media Power: Alternative Media in a Networked World (Lanham, MD: Rowman and Littlefield, 2003): 111-127. view
- (with Erik Neveu, Eds.) Bourdieu and the Journalistic Field (Cambridge, UK: Polity Press, 2005).
- Benson, Rodney (2004). "Bringing the Sociology of Media Back in". Political Communication. 21 (3): 275–292. doi:10.1080/10584600490481299. S2CID 6981053.
- Benson, Rodney; Saguy, Abigail C. (2005). "Constructing Social Problems in an Age of Globalization: A French-American Comparison". American Sociological Review. 70 (2): 233–259. doi:10.1177/000312240507000203. S2CID 17426133.
- Benson, Rodney; Hallin, Daniel C. (2007). "How States, Markets and Globalization Shape the News". European Journal of Communication. 22: 27–48. doi:10.1177/0267323107073746. S2CID 145506728.
- Benson, Rodney (2010). "What Makes for a Critical Press? A Case Study of French and U.S. Immigration News Coverage". The International Journal of Press/Politics. 15: 3–24. doi:10.1177/1940161209349346. S2CID 145439363.
- Benson, Rodney; Blach-Ørsten, Mark; Powers, Matthew; Willig, Ida; Zambrano, Sandra Vera (2012). "Media Systems Online and Off: Comparing the Form of News in the United States, Denmark, and France" (PDF). Journal of Communication. 62: 21–38. doi:10.1111/j.1460-2466.2011.01625.x.
