= Shadows of Liberty =

2012 film by Jean-Philippe Tremblay

- Film poster
- Directed by: Jean-Philippe Tremblay
- Written by: Jean-Philippe Tremblay; Dan Cantagallo
- Produced by: Jean-Philippe Tremblay; Dan Cantagallo
- Narrated by: Kerry Shale
- Cinematography: Arthur Jafa
- Edited by: Gregers Sall
- Music by: Tandis Jenhudson
- Production company: DocFactory
- Distributed by: First Hand Films
- Release date: 27 April 2012 (Hot Docs Canadian International Documentary Festival)
- Running time: 93 minutes
- Country: United Kingdom
- Language: English

Shadows of Liberty is a 2012 British documentary film directed by Canadian filmmaker Jean-Philippe Tremblay. The documentary examines the impact of corporate media and concentration of media ownership on journalism and the news. It is based on the book The Media Monopoly by Ben Bagdikian. The film's title is borrowed from a Thomas Paine quote: "When men yield up the privilege of thinking, the last shadow of liberty quits the horizon."

The film portrays the U.S. media, including the major TV networks, as controlled by fewer and larger conglomerates that exercise extraordinary political social and economic power. It is structured around 14 vignettes that allege censorship at the U.S. networks, including the 1996 TWA 800 air disaster controversy and Nike sweatshops in Asia. It also alleges how the investigation of these stories has cost the jobs and in some cases the lives of investigating journalists (as suggested by the case of Gary Webb who committed suicide in 2004). It features interviews with journalists, activists and academics including Amy Goodman, Danny Glover, Julian Assange, Dan Rather, David Simon, Norman Solomon, Robert Baer, Roberta Baskin, Robert W. McChesney, Daniel Ellsberg, Chris Hedges, Deepa Kumar, and Kristina Borjesson.

== Release ==
The film received its premiere at the 2012 Hot Docs Canadian International Documentary Festival. It received its U.S. premiere at the 2013 National Conference for Media Reform in Denver, Colorado.

== Reception ==
It was selected at numerous festivals including Sheffield Doc/Fest and IDFA.

Film critics gave the film mixed reviews. The Hollywood Reporter reported that "The timing couldn’t be better for a theatrical documentary about a corporate media monopoly in American journalism." Rabble.ca gave the film high praise, describing it as "beautifully shot and replete with artful graphics and animation, Shadows of Liberty stands on its own as a beautiful artifact" adding that "Artistry, cinematic or otherwise, and clear-eyed political vision rarely come this close together. Shadows of Liberty as a film, and Jean Philippe Tremblay as auteur are both definitely newsworthy." The Toronto Star gave the film two-and-a-half stars out of four, reporting that "Shadows of Liberty asks consumers to look critically at what they are being told, and seek out what they are not" but added that "Unfortunately, the damning material Tremblay uses is dated". Exclaim! described the film as "professionally made but somewhat bloated".
