= Arthur Jafa =

American artist and cinematographer

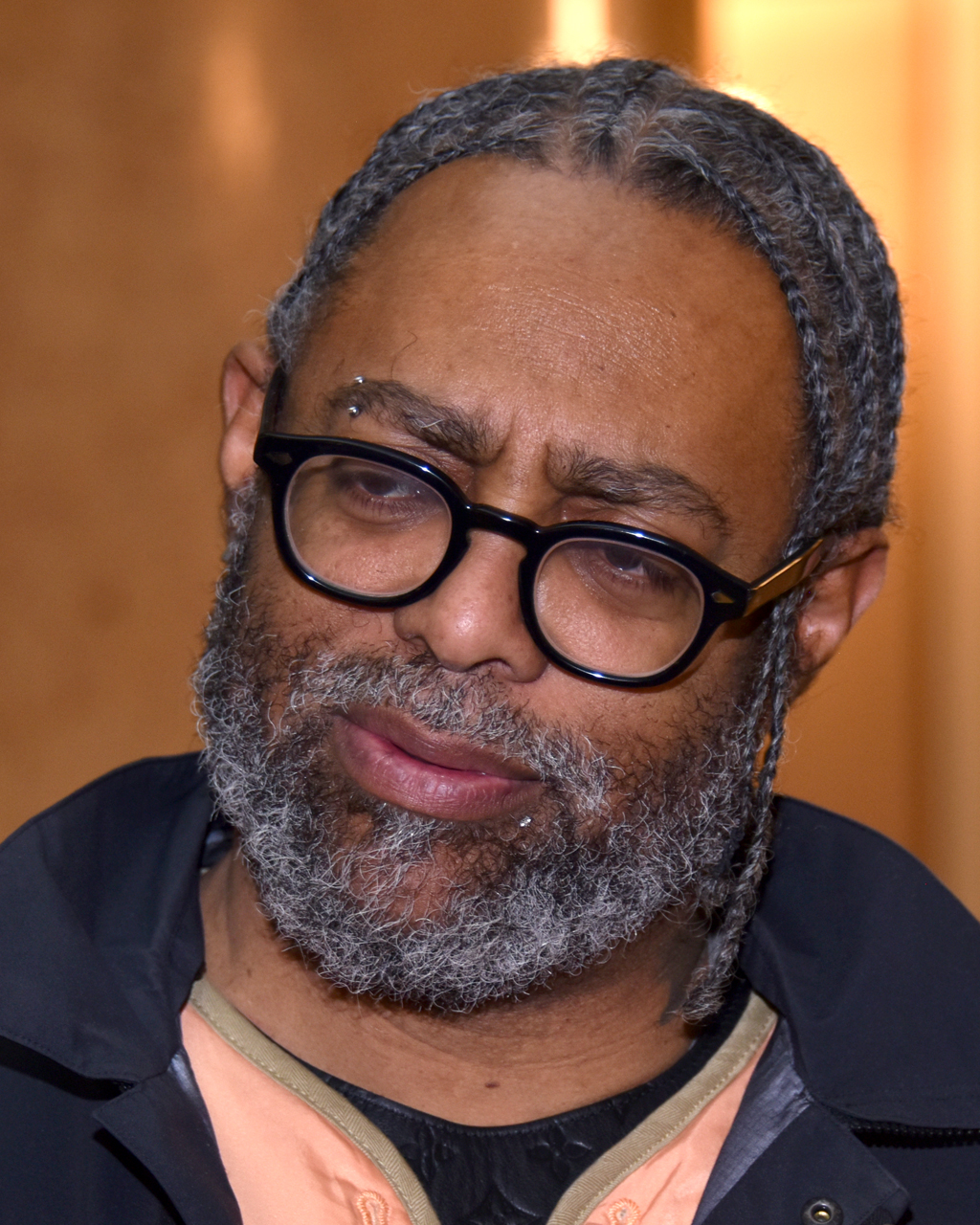
- Jafa at Galerie Rudolfinum, Prague, 2019
- Born: Arthur Jafa Fielder; November 30, 1960 (age 65); Tupelo, Mississippi, U.S.
- Education: Howard University
- Occupations: Artist and cinematographer
- Known for: Video
- Notable work: Daughters of the Dust; Love Is the Message, The Message Is Death
- Spouse: Julie Dash (m. 1983, separated)
- Awards: Best Cinematography, Sundance Film Festival (1992); Golden Lion, Venice Biennale (2019)

Arthur Jafa (/ˈdʒeɪfə/; born Arthur Jafa Fielder, November 30, 1960) is an American video artist and cinematographer.

== Early life and education ==
Jafa was born on November 30, 1960, in Tupelo, Mississippi, and was raised in Clarksdale, Mississippi, which was highly segregated at the time. His parents were both educators and Jafa was raised Catholic.

As a child, Jafa assembled binders full of found images in collections he called "the books." He also grew up watching television shows like I Spy, and science fiction programs.

Jafa studied architecture and film at Howard University, including with professor Dr. Abiyi Ford, before moving to Atlanta, Georgia.

== Artistic career ==
The science fiction programs Jafa watched as a child have informed his artistic practice as an adult, as seen in his self-portrait LeRage (2017). His work is also inspired by his interest in jazz musician Miles Davis.

He has exhibited at the Hirshhorn Museum and Sculpture Garden, the Museum of Contemporary Art, Los Angeles, and the Julia Stoschek Collection, as well as many others. He has worked as a cinematographer with directors Julie Dash and Spike Lee. His work on Dash's Daughters of the Dust (1991) won the "Best Cinematography" Award at Sundance. He also was an assistant photographer for Eyes Wide Shut.

His seven-minute video essay Love Is the Message, The Message Is Death is in the collections of the Metropolitan Museum of Art, the Pérez Art Museum Miami, the Museum of Contemporary Art, Los Angeles, The San Francisco Museum of Modern Art, and the High Museum of Art. Set to Kanye West's song Ultralight Beam, the work consists of a series of found images and video clips depicting a range of Black American experiences throughout history which establishes that the black experience is not monolithic, every experience is unique. Among many other clips exploring African American life and resiliency, the video essay juxtaposes recordings of police violence and footage from the Civil Rights Movement with clips of Black artistry, pop culture, celebration, and creativity. Jafa himself has connected the ethos of the work with his Catholic roots and Gian Lorenzo Bernini's Ecstasy of Saint Teresa. On Friday, June 26, 2020, 13 museums in 7 countries pledged, with Jafa's blessing, to stream the work for free on their respective websites for 48 hours. Frieze named the work No.12 of "The 25 Best Works of the 21st Century".

Jafa also has worked on a number of music videos and was the director of photography on videos for Solange's Don't Touch My Hair and Cranes in the Sky. He was included in the 2017 ArtReview Power 100 list.

Jafa co-founded TNEG along with Malik Hassan Sayeed, a "motion picture studio whose goal is to create a black cinema as culturally, socially, and economically central to the 21st century as was black music to the 20th century". TNEG has produced a number of works such as Dreams Are Colder Than Death and the music video for Jay-Z's song 4:44.

In 2018, Jafa released the approximately forty-minute-long video essay entitled The White Album, which uses found video clips from CCTV, cell phones, documentaries, and more to explore whiteness and racism in the United States of America. He was awarded the Golden Lion for best artist at the 2019 Venice Biennale for The White Album. The White Album was shown at the Hammer Museum from March 14 – August 30, 2026.

In 2020, he produced a music video for Kanye West's single Wash Us in the Blood.

As of 2021, the artists's work is represented by Gladstone Gallery. He is currently working on a project that is a feature film that focuses on how black music has greatly influenced American culture.

In 2023, Jafa was nominated for the Deutsche Börse Photography Foundation Prize for his 2022 exhibition Live Evil at LUMA Arles in Arles, France. His work was featured alongside fellow Prize nominees Bieke Depoorter, Samuel Fosso, and Frida Orupabo at the Photographers’ Gallery, London, which opened in March 2023.

== Personal life ==
While working on a film with Charles Burnett in 1980, Jafa met the director Julie Dash. Dash and Jafa married in 1983 and had a daughter, N'Zinga in 1984. The couple later separated, after collaborating on the film Daughters of the Dust.

== Selected filmography ==
=== Personal projects ===
- Apex (2013)
- Dreams Are Colder Than Death (2014)
- Love Is the Message, The Message Is Death (2016)
- The White Album (2018)
- akingdoncomethas (2020)

=== Music videos ===
- Solange Knowles, "Don't Touch My Hair" (2016) — cinematographer
- Solange Knowles, "Cranes in the Sky" (2016) — cinematographer
- Jay-Z, "4:44" (2017) — director
- Kanye West, "Wash Us in the Blood" (2020) — director

=== Other projects ===
- Daughters of the Dust (1991) — director of photography
- The Darker Side of Black (1993) — cinematography
- Seven Songs for Malcolm X (1993) — cinematography
- Crooklyn (1994) — director of photography
- A Litany for Survival: The Life and Work of Audre Lorde (1995) — cinematography
- Rouch in Reverse (1995) — camera
- W.E.B. DuBois: A Biography in Four Voices (1996) — cinematography
- Bamako Sigi-Kan (2003) — director of photography
- Conakry Kas (2004) — director of photography
- In The Morning (2011) — producer; director of photography
- Shadows of Liberty (2012) — cinematography
- Roomieloverfriends (2012) — director of photography
- The Start Up (2013) — cinematography
- Florida Water (2014) — cinematography
- Killing Me Softly: The Roberta Flack Story (2014) — director of photography
