= Free Press (advocacy group) =

Media reform advocacy group in the U.S.

- Formation: 2003; 23 years ago
- Founded: 2003; 23 years ago
- Type: Nonprofit organization
- Tax ID no.: 41-2106721
- Legal status: 501(c)(3)
- Location: Washington, D.C., U.S.
- Fields: Public policy
- Co-CEO: Craig Aaron
- Co-CEO: Jessica J. González
- Affiliations: Free Press Action Fund _{(501(c)(4))}
- Website: www.freepress.net

Free Press is a United States advocacy group that is part of the media reform or media democracy movement. The group is a major supporter of net neutrality.

== History, organization, and activities ==
Free Press is a 501(c)(3) organization. Free Press Action Fund is a 501(c)(4) organization and is the group's advocacy arm.

Free Press was co-founded in 2003 by media scholar Robert W. McChesney, progressive journalist John Nichols, and activist Josh Silver.

It is part of the broader "media reform movement" (or "media democracy movement"), and has described its work in these terms. This movement promotes ideas of "media localism" and opposes media consolidation. Like other organizations that are part of the same movement (such as the Consumer Federation of America, Consumers Union and the Center for Digital Democracy), Free Press is concerned with issues such as Federal Communications Commission regulations, "as well as Congressional funding for public broadcasting and the malfeasance of corporate media."

Free Press led the Save the Internet coalition, which advocated for net neutrality. The coalition consisted of individuals, nonprofits, and companies, ranging from advocacy groups to consumer groups to Silicon Valley companies including Google and Microsoft.

Free Press organized six National Conferences for Media Reform (NCMRs) from 2003 to 2013.

In July 2025, Free Press released the Media Capitulation Index, a ranking of the independence of the 35 largest media companies in the United States. The release of the index was accompanied by a report, "A More Perfect Media: Saving America's Fourth Estate from Billionaires, Broligarchy and Trump", which calls for a number of measures to embolden large media firms to act in the interests of democracy and against authoritarianism. The report explains the chicken ranking system used by the index.

== Net neutrality ==
Free Press is a strong supporter of net neutrality. In 2008, Free Press was the key mover in a pro-net neutrality campaign that "drew together strange bedfellows, including the Christian Coalition, the American Civil Liberties Union and the Gun Owners of America, and helped set in motion a broader debate on the issue" that resulted in an FCC hearing on the subject. In its campaign for net neutrality, Free Press has been allied with Democratic members of Congress. The group supports the 2015 Open Internet Order, in which the FCC classified broadband internet as a common carrier service under Title II of the Communications Act of 1934, which meant that "no content could be blocked by broadband providers and that the internet would not be divided into pay-to-play fast lanes for internet and media companies that can afford it and slow lanes for everyone else."

== See also ==
- Media activism
