= Media reform =

Media reform is the attempt to reform mass media. Media reform movement coincides with media democracy as a concept and is interlinked with the agenda setting theory. In 1922, in his book, Public Opinion, Walter Lippmann argued that the mass media are the principal connection between events in the world and the images in the minds of the public. He stated that the media has an ability to influence the thoughts and opinions of the members of public consuming the content. He did not use the term "agenda setting", but scholars have come to agree that was the core concept.

The traditional media reform movement has undergone significant changes with the rise of citizen journalism, whereby citizens play an active role in the process of collecting, reporting, analyzing, and disseminating news and information. The modern media reform movement relies heavily on the Internet and the numerous social networking tools it offers and the Internet coupled with citizen curated content has led to a decrease in the popularity of traditional media networks.

The Canadian media reform movement has its roots in the 1930s, Canadian Campaign for Press and Broadcasting Freedom. Highlighting the threats of cultural Americanisation and excessive commercialism, and calling for universal radio service that would not be viable through market forces alone, the Canadian Radio League assembled a blue-ribbon coalition to persuade a Conservative government to create the Canadian Broadcasting Corporation. In a 2010 survey by Open Media, Canadian mainstream media’s democratic performance has been rated as poor or very poor by Canadians. Although many NGOs report positive relationships with particular media, NGOs appear to have a more favorable view of CBC and of independent media, which rely heavily on citizen journalism and has led to the rise of blogger culture.

== See also ==
- Alternative media
- Citizen media
- Fairness Doctrine
- Media activism
- Media democracy
- National Conference for Media Reform
- Net neutrality
- Category:Media reform to improve democracy on Wikiversity
