= New Jersey Civic Information Consortium =

The New Jersey Civic Information Consortium (NJCIC) is a 501(c)(3) nonprofit that funds initiatives to benefit the State's civic life information needs. They hope to address the growing problems of news deserts and misinformation.

NJCIC is a 501(c)(3) nonprofit that funds initiatives to benefit the State's civic life information needs in collaboration with one of the five members of the consortium: The College of New Jersey, Montclair State University, the New Jersey Institute of Technology, Rowan University and Rutgers University. Successful grant applications must propose a collaboration connecting at least one off-campus partner with at least one of the five higher-education partners to address the growing problems of news deserts and misinformation. Projects should improve the civil information available in the state, make it easier for residents to access public information, train people in community storytelling, journalism, and media production, improve civic engagement and dialogue, support underserved communities, and invest in research to improve the responsiveness of media to their audiences.

== Background ==
In 2016 the U.S. Federal Communications Commission (FCC) took steps to improve mobile services like AT&T and Verizon by converting to that use portions of the electromagnetic spectrum that had been used by broadcasters. The 501(c)(3) Free Press and it's 501(c)(4) advocacy arm, the Free Press Action Fund, began organizing in New Jersey to convince the state government that these are public media assets, and the proceeds should be used to improve locally available media.

This FCC project ended in 2017 with 175 U.S. broadcasters selling their frequencies for a total of $10 billion. As part of this sale, New Jersey received $332 million for two public broadcasting television stations, and the government agreed that some of that money should be used to improve the information and media available to the public.

The organizing effort by Free Press and others secured passage of New Jersey's Civic Information Consortium bill in 2018, but no money was allocated for it. It faced strong opposition from conservatives opposed to public funding of media, especially in the Assembly; it had bipartisan support in the New Jersey state Senate with only one "Nay" to 35 "Yea" votes (and 4 "Other").

In September 2020, the New Jersey Governor signed a budget that included $500,000 for the New Jersey Civic Information Consortium.

== Launch ==
On March 3, 2021, the New Jersey Civic Info Consortium invited proposals for projects for the first time. This followed listening sessions in every county in the state, along with other meetings with journalists and community members and a statewide survey to better understand the public's information needs. These initial grants were to be capped at $35,000. June 3, 2021, the NJCIC announced awards to 14 of 74 applicants.

== Similar efforts elsewhere ==
Free Press is working to develop similar projects in other states under their "News Voices" program. One in North Carolina began in 2017. Another was initiated in Philadelphia in 2019.
