= Abiyi Ford =

Film educator and filmmaker

Abraham "Abiyi" Ford (1935–2018) was an Ethiopian-American film educator and filmmaker.

== Early life and education ==
Ford was born and raised in Ethiopia. His parents, Mignon Inniss Ford and Arnold Josiah Ford, moved to Ethiopia in the early 1930s as diasporic Blacks interested in pan-Africanism. Arnold Ford was a colleague of Marcus Garvey and a leader in the University Negro Improvement Association in the 1920s.

Ford attended Piney Woods Junior College outside Jackson, Mississippi and then joined the US Air Force. He attended Columbia University for undergraduate and graduate work, where he received an MFA.

== Career ==
He was a professor in the Department of Media, Journalism, and Film at Howard University. He helped establish the graduate film program along with African American filmmaker Alonzo Crawford and Ethiopian filmmaker Haile Gerima. This program became an important training ground and community of independent Black filmmakers. Students included the artist Arthur Jafa. He described his motivation for this work in an interview in 1993, saying "Film is the most powerful tool of social influence that man has ever known . . . I strongly feel the need to wield the power of film the awful damages done to the images of peoples of non-Western culture."

An article about Ford from 1983 noted that

"Although Ford has made some films through the years (an educational series for New York's Bank Street College of Education, some short experimental ventures, a documentary on the First Pan African Cultural Festival in Algeria in 1969), he is known primarily for his work as a teacher and a theoretician of film."

After his retirement from Howard University in 2006, he joined the faculty of the Graduate School of Journalism and Communications at Addis Ababa University.

== Filmography ==
- Lois Mailou Jones: Fifty Years of Painting (1983)
- Burkina Faso: Land of the People of Dignity (1988) – documentary produced in partnership with Fanta Regina Nacro of the Institut d'Education Cinématographique de Ouagadougou (INAFEC), in Burkina Faso.
