= Save the Internet =

Save the Internet is a coalition of individuals, businesses, and non-profit organizations working for the preservation of Net neutrality. The site encourages taking action against discrimination of bandwidth distribution on the Internet.

== History ==
Save the Internet was founded in April 2006 in order to advocate for net neutrality. When Save the Internet formed, it asserted the idea that network neutrality needed to be protected by a "First Amendment" of the Internet. As the First Amendment to the United States Constitution includes protection of freedoms of speech and of the press, so would a proposed Internet first amendment protect network neutrality, which would allow for equal access to every website.

January 14, 2014 - Court overturned the Federal Communications Commission's Net Neutrality due to a lawsuit by Verizon.

In September 2018, Article 13 was rejected after being put to a vote.

On January 22, 2019, Article 13 is halted and rejected now.

== Function ==
This online activist organization functions mainly as a source for public awareness and as a catalyst promoting civic action, such as petitioning Congress to support net neutrality. The website also runs a blog which keeps users up to date on threats to internet neutrality, amongst other things. Previous petitions garnered as many as 1.9 million signatures.

== See also ==
- Media democracy
- National Conference for Media Reform
- Telecoms Package
