= Philip Shabecoff =

American journalist

Philip Shabecoff was a reporter for The New York Times from 1959 to 1991. He has since specialized in writing about environmental issues.

== New York Times career ==
He was posted as a foreign correspondent in West Germany from 1964 to 1968, with responsibilities for covering East and West Germany, Scandinavia, and Czechoslovakia; then posted to Tokyo, from 1968 to 1970, with responsibilities for covering Japan, Korea, Vietnam, Indonesia, the Philippines, Malaysia, Hong Kong, Singapore and Thailand.

Returning to the U.S., he then covered economics and labor for the New York Times's Washington Bureau. He was White House correspondent during the Nixon and Ford administrations.

Shabecoff served as The New York Times's environmental correspondent from 1977 to 1991. He has been described as "a pioneer" for breaking new ground in defining environmental news and setting a standard for coverage that earned him the sobriquet of "dean of environmental journalism." He left the New York Times in 1991.

He then founded and, for five years, served as publisher of Greenwire, the daily online digest of worldwide environmental news coverage, which remains today a leading source of environmental news. It was bought in 2000 by Environment & Energy Publishing.

He was one of the founding members of the Society of Environmental Journalists.

He has been a contributing author to American Government, by Charles Hamilton, and The Presidency Reappraised, Thomas Cronin and Rexford Tugwell, editors.

Shabecoff has appeared on Meet the Press, Face the Nation, Washington Week in Review, CNN News, The Diane Rehm Show, C-SPAN, National Public Radio, and the BBC.

== Books ==
A Fierce Green Fire, published by Hill & Wang, in 1993 (and published as paperback by Island Press, 2003) was his first full-length book. It is the definitive history and analysis of American environmentalism, from its early seeds in efforts to preserve wilderness through its maturity as a social, political and cultural movement; it offers the hope that “we will be able to save ourselves from the grave dangers we have created by our destructive use of the natural world.”

That was followed by A New Name for Peace: International Environmentalism, Sustainable Development and Democracy, published by the University Press of New England in 1996, which provides a history of international environmentalism from its beginnings, and uses the 1992 Rio Earth Summit to analyze the successes and failures of environmental actions worldwide; concluding that peace must be based on mutual care for the planet and the well-being of others with whom we share it.

Earth Rising: American Environmentalism in the 21st Century, published by Island Press in 2000, analyzes the strengths and weaknesses of the American environmental movement, calling for a broader, more inclusive movement with a role in reforming education, politics, the economy and science to transform the future. In that book, he argued that environmental concerns can not be met without confronting other issues, mainly social and economical. He thus underlined the failure to "recognize and acknowledge that the decline of the environment is not an issue distinct from other flaws in our society" and that environmentalists "are in the same boat with other groups of Americans who are thwarted and victimized by the status quo," and "[t]hey will have to play a role in changing our political and economic systems."

In collaboration with his wife Alice, he wrote Poisoned Profits: The Toxic Assault on Our Children, published in 2008 by Random House; Chelsea Green published the paperback in 2010 with the title as Poisoned for Profit: How Toxins Are Making Our Children Chronically Ill.

== Awards ==
Shabecoff has received the James Madison Award from the American Library Association for leadership in expanding the public's right to know and was an original selectee for the Global 500 award from the United Nations Environment Programme.

He also received the National Wildlife Federation's “Connie” Award for achievement in conservation, the Sierra Club's David Brower Environmental Journalism Award, and the Worldwatch Institute's Environmental Leadership Award “In honor of 20 years of pioneering environmental journalism”

== Background ==
Mr. Shabecoff grew up in the Bronx, New York, attended the Bronx High School of Science, and earned his B.A. from Hunter College; he earned his M.A. degree from the University of Chicago.

He and his wife have two children, Alexa, who is the assistant dean for public service at the Harvard Law School, and Peter, who is the founder and CEO of Atlantic Street Capital, a private equity fund.

== Bibliography ==
- Shabecoff, Philip (1993), A Fierce Green Fire: The American Environmental Movement, Island Press
- Shabecoff, Philip (1996), A New Name For Peace: International Environmentalism, Sustainable Development, and Democracy, University Press of New England
- Shabecoff, Philip (2000), Earth Rising: American Environmentalism in the 21st Century, Island Press
- Shabecoff, Philip and Shabecoff, Alice (2010), Poisoned for Profit. How Toxins are Making Our Children Chronically Ill

Shabecoff, Philip,(2013) Places: Habitats of a Human Lifetime (Becket Mountain Books) a memoir focused on places in which Mr. Shabecoff has lived and worked. Named a "Best Book of 2013" by Kirkus Reviews.
