= Henry Graff =

American historian (1921–2020)

Henry F. Graff
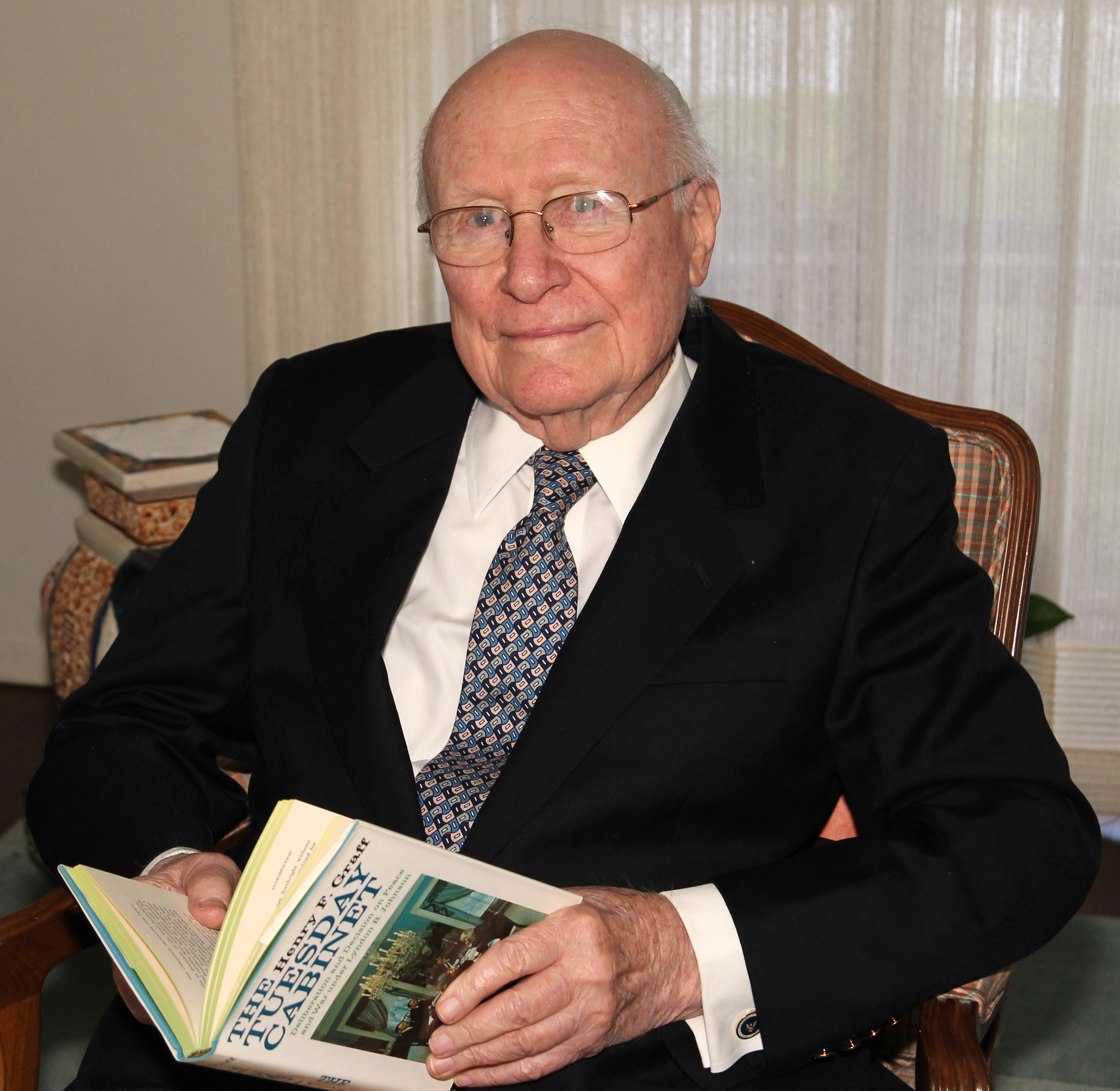
- Graff in 2014
- Born: Henry Franklin Graff; August 11, 1921; New York City, U.S.
- Died: April 7, 2020 (aged 98); Greenwich, Connecticut, U.S.
- Education: City College (BSS); Columbia University (PhD)
- Occupations: Historian, author, college professor
- Spouse: Edith Graff
- Writing career
- Years active: 1946–2000
- Subjects: American Presidency, Foreign relations

Henry Franklin Graff (August 11, 1921 – April 7, 2020) was an American historian who served on the faculty of Columbia University from 1946 to 1991, including a period as chairman of the History Department.

Graff specialized in the history of the Presidency of the United States and of American foreign relations. His pioneering “Seminar on the Presidency,” one of Columbia's most popular courses, was attended by President Harry Truman in 1959 and President Gerald Ford in 1989. Graff has twice served as chairman of the Pulitzer Prize jury in American history.

In 1965, President Lyndon B. Johnson appointed Graff to the National Historical Publications Commission, and in 1993 President Bill Clinton appointed Graff to the President John F. Kennedy Assassination Records Review Board. In 2005, Graff received an honorary doctor of letters degree from Columbia in recognition of his contributions to the field of American history, service to presidents and to the university.

He died from complications brought on by COVID-19 during the COVID-19 pandemic.

== Early life and education ==
Graff was born on August 11, 1921, in New York City, the son of Florence B. Morris and Samuel F. Graff, a salesman in the garment district in New York City. His parents were natives of New York, and of German Jewish extraction. He had a twin sister, Myra Balber.

Graff attended George Washington High School and graduated from City College of New York, where he received a B.S.S. degree, magna cum laude, in 1941. He was elected to Phi Beta Kappa. He was studying for his master's at Columbia, as the first Jewish student in the History Department of the university, in 1942 when he enlisted in the army. He earned the degree later, and returned to teach at Columbia in 1946 and earned his Ph.D. in 1949.

Graff recounted stories from his life here.

== Military service ==
Graff enlisted in the army shortly after Pearl Harbor, and rose from private to first lieutenant in the Signal Corps prior to his discharge in 1946. As a result of studying Japanese at Columbia, he served as a Japanese language officer and cryptanalyst in the Signal Intelligence Service (SIS) (predecessor of the National Security Agency). In this role, he read foreign codes and ciphers, particularly the now famous Purple code.

In November 1943, Graff translated part of a message which is well recalled in histories of the remarkable code-breaking successes of the American and British – that proved invaluable to the Allied planners in England. It had been sent by Lieutenant General Hiroshi Oshima, the Japanese ambassador to Germany, to the Japanese foreign minister in Tokyo, recounting in intimate detail what the ambassador had seen of German preparations in north France to repel the expected cross-Channel invasion force. He also translated a message from Japan to the Soviet Union, detailing Japan's plan to get out of the war. He received a War Department Citation and the Army Commendation Medal for his service.

BBC noted in its documentary Hiroshima that Graff translated an intercepted communique from the Japanese to the Soviet Union, making Graff the first American to know of Imperial Japan's imminent surrender.

== Career ==
Upon returning to civilian life, Graff taught for a semester in the History Department of City College before joining the faculty of Columbia University in 1946. He remained on the faculty of Columbia until he retired in 1991, serving for a period as chairman of the Department of History.

In addition to Columbia, Graff was a visiting professor at Vassar College, and he has lectured on many other campuses, including those of the service academies. He has been the distinguished speaker at the United States Air Force Academy, and the Sol Feinstone Memorial Lecturer at the Jewish Theological Seminary.

Graff twice served as chairman of the Pulitzer Prize jury for American history and also served as chairman of the jury for the Bancroft Prize.

Graff was a historical consultant to Time magazine, CBS and ABC for various publications and television programs. In 1989, 1993, 1997 and 2001, he was a commentator on the coverage of the Presidential inauguration on ABC, with Peter Jennings. In 2005, Graff was a commentator for George W. Bush's second inauguration on the Public Broadcasting Service. He served similarly on the CBS network in April 1994 during its coverage of the funeral of President Richard Nixon, anchored by Connie Chung, and with Peter Jennings on ABC during its coverage of the D-Day anniversary commemoration on June 6, 1994.

Graff served for years as a member of the board of directors of the Rand McNally Company. He also served on the board of trustees of the Columbia University Press.

Graff's professional societies and affiliations included the American Historical Association, the Organization of American Historians, the Society of the Historians of American Foreign Relations, P.E.N.), and the Authors Guild. He was a Fellow of the Society of American Historians. He was also a member of the Century Association and the Council on Foreign Relations.

== Government service ==
Graff served for six years on the National Historical Publications Commission (1965–1971), to which he had been appointed by President Lyndon B. Johnson. Beginning in 1971 he served for a number of years on the Historical Advisory Committee of the United States Air Force, by appointment of the Secretary of the Air Force.

In 1993 he was nominated by President Clinton and confirmed by the Senate for membership on the President John F. Kennedy Assassination Records Review Board, which submitted its report to the President in 1998.

== Books ==
Graff is the author or editor of more than a dozen books, primarily on topics in American history, including several widely used text books.

His first book was Bluejackets with Perry in Japan, published by the New York Public Library in 1952.

With legendary historian and professorial colleague Jacques Barzun, Graff co-authored The Modern Researcher. First published in 1957 and now in its Sixth Edition (2004), it is frequently described as "the classic work on research and editing."

Graff's best-known general work is The Tuesday Cabinet: Deliberation and Decision on Peace and War under Lyndon B. Johnson, which was based on extensive conversations over a period of years with the President and his principal advisers, chiefly on the subject of the Vietnam War.

A well-established standard reference work is Graff's The Presidents: A Reference History (1984). On invitation, Graff presented successive editions of the book to Presidents Reagan, Clinton and George W. Bush for placement in the White House Library.

Graff is the author of Grover Cleveland, a volume in the American Presidents series edited by Arthur M. Schlesinger Jr (2002).

Graff is also the author of widely used high school and junior high school American history textbooks: America, The Glorious Republic; This Great Nation: A History of the United States; The Free and the Brave; The Call of Freedom (with Paul Bohannan); The Promise of Democracy (with Paul Bohannan); and The Adventure of the American People (with John A. Krout).

== Other publications ==
Graff wrote extensively for leading historical and popular journals and magazines. His book reviews frequently appeared in The New York Times Book Review; his articles on the Presidency and on international affairs appeared in The New York Times Magazine and on the op-ed pages of The New York Times and The Los Angeles Times. He contributed many articles to the Dictionary of American Biography and to other encyclopedias and compilations, including the Encyclopedia of the American Presidency and Scribner’s Encyclopedia of American Lives for which he wrote biographies of famous baseball players.

Graff was chairman of the editorial board of Constitution magazine and was a member of the editorial advisory board of the four-volume Encyclopedia of the American Presidency published by Simon & Schuster in 1994. He was on the editorial board of the Presidential Studies Quarterly.

== Awards and honors ==
Graff has been honored with Columbia's Great Teacher Award, and with the Mark Van Doren Award, bestowed by the student body of Columbia College for distinguished teaching and scholarship. He received City College's Townsend Harris Medal in recognition of distinguished post-graduate achievement in his chosen field.

In 1990 he was honored with the Kidger Award of the New England History Teachers' Association for distinction as a teacher and author.

Graff was honored with a senior fellowship at the Freedom Forum Media Studies Center (formerly the Gannett Foundation Media Center) at Columbia for the academic year 1991–1992, in order to work on his book of essays on the presidency, entitled "The Role of the Press in Shaping the Persona of the Presidency.”

In 1997 he received the President's Medal of George Washington University - the university's highest award – in honor of his accomplishments as a historian, teacher, and mentor. On March 16, 1997 (Freedom of Information Day) he received the James Madison Award of the American Library Association "as a champion of the right to know" and for his work as a member of the President John F. Kennedy Assassination Records Review Board.

In 2000 the Westchester Community College Foundation honored him with its Lifetime Achievement Award for his scholarship in American history and the American presidency.

The Kaul Foundation in 2001 bestowed on him its Award for Excellence in Education and for serving "the highest ideals of scholarship as a historian" and expert on the American presidency and American diplomatic history.

In 2005, he received an honorary Litt.D. degree from Columbia University.

== Personal life ==
Graff married the former Edith Krantz on June 16, 1946. She died on May 23, 2019. They had two daughters (Iris Morse and Ellen Graff), five grandchildren and five great-grandchildren. They lived in Scarsdale, Westchester County, New York.

He died at a hospital in Greenwich, Connecticut, on April 7, 2020, at the age of 98 from complications of COVID-19.

== Works ==
Title	Year published
Inaugural Addresses of the Presidents of the United States from W.H. Taft to G.W. Bush	2005
The Modern Researcher (with Jacques Barzun)	1957, 6th ed. 2004
Grover Cleveland	2002
The Presidents: A Reference History	1984, 3rd ed. 2002
The Kennedy Assassination. Final Report of the Assassination Records Review Board	1998
America, The Glorious Republic	1985
This Great Nation: A History of the United States	1983
The Call of Freedom (with Paul Bohannan)	1978
The Promise of Democracy (with Paul Bohannan)	1978
America at 200: Essays (with Richard B. Morris)	1975
The Life History of the United States, 12 vols.	1975
The Adventure of the American People (with John A. Krout)	1971
The Tuesday Cabinet: Deliberation and Decision on Peace and War under Lyndon B. Johnson	1970
American Imperialism and the Philippine Insurrection (Testimony of the Times: Selections From Congressional Hearings)	1969
The Free and the Brave : The Story of the American People	1967
Bluejackets with Perry in Japan: A Day-by-Day Account Kept By Master's Mate John R. C. Lewis and Cabin Boy William B. Allen	1952
