= James Madison Award =

The James Madison Award is administered by the American Library Association, which describes the award:

The award named for President James Madison was established in 1989 and is presented annually on the anniversary of his birth to honor individuals or groups who have championed, protected and promoted public access to government information and the public's right to know at the national level.

== Recipients ==
- Jon Tester, 2017
- Seamus Kraft, The OpenGov Foundation 2016
- Senator John Cornyn (R-TX), 2015
- President Barack Obama's Review Group on Intelligence and Communications Technologies, 2014
- Aaron Swartz, 2013 (posthumously)
- Zoe Lofgren, 2012
- Patrice McDermott, 2011
- Citizens for Responsibility and Ethics in Washington (CREW), 2010 - Co-Winner
- Meredith Fuchs, 2010
- Thomas M. Susman, 2009
- Russ Feingold, 2008
- Paul K. McMasters, 2007
- Steve Aftergood, 2006
- Richard M. Schmidt, 2005
- David Sobel, 2004
- Former U.S. Congressman Steve Horn; Government of Arlington County (VA), 2003
- Steven Garfinkel, retired director of the Information Security Oversight Office; John E. Moss the author of the Freedom of Information Act (awarded posthumously) 2002
- John D. Podesta, former White House Chief of Staff, 2001
- Larry Irving, former Assistant Secretary of Commerce for Communications and Information, 2000
- Board members and congressional sponsors of the President John F. Kennedy Assassination Records Review Board, including former Senator John Glenn and Representatives Dan Burton, Henry Waxman, and Louis Stokes and Board members: Honorable John R. Tunheim (chair), Henry F. Graff, Kermit L. Hall, William L. Joyce and Anna Kasten Nelson. 1999
- Ben Bagdikian, journalist, Wayne P. Kelley, former Superintendent of Documents of the Government Printing Office, Eliot Christian and the U.S. Geological Survey, National Library of Medicine. 1998
- George Soros, philanthropist and financier, 1997
- The National Information Infrastructure Advisory Council, 1996
- The Government Printing Office, the State of Maryland's Sailor Project, the Seattle (WA) Public Library, and the Internet Multicasting Service's Town Hall Project, 1995
- Secretary of Energy Hazel O'Leary, and former ALA Washington Office Director Eileen D. Cooke, 1994
- The legislators who led the passage of P.L. 103–40, the GPO Access Act: Vice President Al Gore, original sponsor of the GPO Gateway to Government Act when he was in the Senate; Senators Wendell Ford (D-KY) and Ted Stevens (R-AK); Representatives Charlie Rose (D-NC) and Bill Thomas (R-CA), 1993
- Journalist Nina Totenberg, author Scott Armstrong, and C-SPAN founder Brian Lamb, 1992
- Representative Don Edwards, 1991
- Senator Frank Lautenberg (D-NJ), Representative Henry Waxman (D-CA), journalist Philip Shabecoff, and the Office of Toxic Substances of the U.S. Environmental Protection Agency, 1990
- Senator Patrick Leahy, 1989
