= Democratic media =

Form of media organization

Democratic media is a form of media organization that strives to have the principles of democracy underlying not only the production of content, but also the organization of the entire project. Civic media is another term with similar concept and therefore can be used interchangeably in many contexts.

The mission of the defunct MIT Center for Civic Media was to design, create, deploy, and assess tools and processes that support and foster civic participation and the flow of information within and between communities, working at the intersection of participatory media and civic engagement.

== Definition of the term ==
Democratic Media is the idea that the media should be organized along democratic lines rather than strictly commercial (or any other form of media arrangement) lines. A functioning democratic media would aim for transparency, inclusiveness, one-person-one-vote and other key concepts of democracy as principals of operation: "This is a media whose primary objectives are to inform, be open, independent and be accountable." This is in contrast to the belief that media should be run by commercial operations and with the objective of making a profit and the assumption that the media invariably reflects the opinions and values of the owner and advertisers. Advocates contrast it to state-run operations where the media reflects the value system of the state itself. Edward S Herman suggested the form that democratic media would take:

A democratic media can be identified by its structure and functions. In terms of structure, it would be organized and controlled by ordinary citizens or their grass roots organisations....As regards function, a democratic media will aim first and foremost at serving the informational, cultural and other communications needs of members of the public which the media institutions comprise or represent.

== Background of the term ==
The idea of democratic media stems from the belief that media is a vital part of a democratic society. Robert W. McChesney, writing for the Boston Review in 2008, commented:

First, media perform essential political, social, economic, and cultural functions in modern democracies. In such societies, media are the principal source of political information and access to public debate, and the key to an informed, participating, self-governing citizenry. Democracy requires a media system that provides people with a wide range of opinion and analysis and debate on important issues, reflects the diversity of citizens, and promotes public accountability of the powers-that-be and the powers-that-want-to-be.

Therefore, if media is vital for democracy, democratic media argues that media itself needs to be organized along different lines to the existing forms. McChesney also states:

The evidence is clear: if we want a media system that produces fundamentally different results, we need solutions that address the causes of the problems; have to address issues of media ownership, management, regulation, and subsidy. Our goal should be to craft a media system that reduces the power of a handful of enormous corporations and advertisers to dominate the media culture.

The idea of democratic media is still in its infancy, according to Carroll & Hackett (2006 where they term it "democratic media activism" however the idea does have older roots; In Triumph of the Market: Essays on Economics, Politics, and the Media Edward S Herman asserted that democratic media was a condition of democracy:

A democratic media is a primary condition of popular rule, hence of a genuine political democracy. Where the media are controlled by a powerful and privileged elite, whether of government leaders and bureaucrats or those of the private sector, democratic political forms and some kind of limited political democracy may exist, but not genuine democracy.

The term has been used to describe a number of new media projects such as Wikipedia and the Indymedia movement when asked how they saw themselves;

Indymedia is a democratic media outlet for the creation of radical, accurate, and passionate tellings of truth.

Democratic media differs from similar (and related) concepts such as citizen media, media democracy and independent media (aka alternative media) in that it puts as much emphasis on the organization of the media project as it does on the content. For democratic media it must have (or strive towards) the following characteristics:

- Open publishing
- Transparency (humanities)
- Accountability
- Open access (publishing)
- Non-commercial

== Need for Democratic Media ==
Community media includes media outlets that serve a particular community, such as local newspapers and radio stations. Some advocates of democratic media argue that greater public participation in media could help community media attract audiences and encourage engagement with democratic issues. Letting the people have a say in the media they consume could help to regain viewership in community media and fight against the new wave of large media outlets. Allowing this mass participation through democratic media could cause the people to become more involved in their own democracies and bring light to the issues that they care about. Some argue that these large media outlets have also had a detrimental effect on our society as they sometimes care more about the ratings and money than reporting the facts.

Media has also had a large effect on history. Many different social rights movements in the early 2000s (such as the extension of citizenship rights) had different types of media as a driving factor in causing change. Individual medias can utilize the power they hold over the public's perception to influence their opinions and choices. The mass media is one of the main factors that determine the public opinion which oftentimes leads to public action. Some argue that utilizing more democratic media sources would help to inform the people and bring the power back to the people by letting them influence the media that they consume.

Others believe that in order to truly be considered a democracy a country must have a democratic media. These believers argue that a country who considers themselves a democracy should not have a media controlled by the powerful and privileged elite. They argue that a media run in this way will misinform the public and show what will support their own agendas. A system run this way could have catastrophic effects on society and the publics perception as they will only be told what the elite want. This could lead to misinformation, poverty, or even war.

== Democratic Media Struggles ==
=== Africa ===
Zimbabwe sees journalists arrested regularly. Many of the news sources within the country have been banned such as The Daily News being banned in 2003 and the weekly Tribune being banned in 2004. These news outlets were all shut down by the government for various different reasons such as violations to the Access to Information and Protection of Privacy Act and for hiring unaccredited journalists. The Zimbabwean government also limits the international press's ability to report from within the country.

In 2010, South Africa had a large stalemate over a proposed bill between the African National Congress (ANC) and print media who both had differing views on the role of media within society. The ANC argued that local news often misreported the news and the local print media argued that they accurately depicted the news and wanted to move towards a more democratic media. The argument displayed two differing views on the role of media within society. The ANC believed that media should have little freedom and be controlled by the government while the media sources believed that media should have complete freedom and be based on democracy. Within Zimbabwe, there are many policies made by the government that can sometimes favor certain demographics over others. Often when the media reports on these policies to inform the public, they are threatened or shut down by the government.

== See also ==
- Citizen media
- Independent media
- Indymedia
- Media democracy
- Propaganda model
