= The Media Monopoly =

1983 book by Ben Bagdikian

- The cover of the book's 4th edition
- Author: Ben Bagdikian
- Language: English
- Subject: Concentration of media ownership
- Publisher: Beacon Press
- Publication date: January 1983
- Publication place: United States
- Pages: 282
- ISBN: 978-0807061626
- Dewey Decimal: 001.51/0973
- LC Class: P92.U5 B33 1983

The Media Monopoly is a book by Ben Bagdikian, published by Beacon Press. It contains his analysis of the concentration of media ownership in the United States. The first edition was published in 1983 and the seventh edition, the latest, was published in 2004 with the name The New Media Monopoly.

The Media Monopoly describes the group of five giant media conglomerates who control the media on which a majority of Americans say they most rely. Bagdikian argues that these five are a major factor in changing the politics of the United States and that they condition the social values of children and adults alike.

== Influence ==
The book Manufacturing Consent by Noam Chomsky and Edward S. Herman, expounding the propaganda model under which mass media operates, cites Bagdikian's work from The Media Monopoly several times.

== See also ==
- Media cross-ownership in the United States
