= Learner-generated context =

The term learner-generated context (LGC) originated in the suggestion that an educational context might be described as a learner-centric ecology of resources and that a learner generated context is one in which a group of users collaboratively marshall available resources to create an ecology that meets their needs.

There are many discussions about user-generated content (UGC), open educational resources (OER), distributed cognition and communities of practice but, although acknowledging the importance of the learning process, there has been little focus on learner-generated contexts or the impact of new technologies on the role of teacher, learner and institution.

== Background ==
The term learner-generated context (LGC) is grounded in the premise that learning and teaching should not start with the embracing of new technologies, but rather that it is a matter of contextualising the learning first before supporting it with technology. The concept finds its roots in the affordances and potentials of a range of disruptive technologies and practice; web 2.0 and participative media, mobile learning, learning design and learning space design. It is also concerned with related issues in social interactions with technology around roles, expertise, knowledge, pedagogy, accreditation, power, participation and democracy.

The learner-generated context concept is concerned with examining the rapid increase in the variety and availability of resources and tools that enable people to easily create and publish their own materials and to access those created by others, and ways in which this extends the capacity for learning context creation beyond the traditional contexts of, inter alia, teachers, academics, designers and policymakers. It is also a concept which challenges existing pedagogies insofar as it sees a new generation of read/write, participatory technologies as enabling learners to take ownership of both their learning and their actions in the real world and to contribute to the co-design of learning resources. In learner generated contexts, technology is seen to offer new dimensions for active participation and creativity in learning.

== Definition ==
The Learner Generated Contexts Research Group was formed at a workshop in Bath (UK) in March 2007. This interdisciplinary research group based at the London Knowledge Lab defines a learner generated context as:

A context created by people interacting together with a common, self-defined or negotiated learning goal. The key aspect of Learner Generated Contexts is that they are generated through the enterprise of those who would previously have been consumers in a context created for them.

== Key issues ==
The emphasis on contexts is key: learning is viewed as a social process occurring across a continuum of contexts, and learning must be "fit for context". The generation of context is characterised as an action on tools where a user actively selects, appropriates and implements learning solutions to meet their own needs. The following key issues emerge from this concept:

- learners as creators not consumers
- learning is facilitated by "agile intermediaries"
- learning moves from regulated practice(s) towards participative collaboration and co-creation
- learner needs participatory control of the learning environment
- environment is physical, social and cognitive
- learning design is purposeful – the 'preferred' and 'best' learning context may not be identical
- co-configuration, co-creation and co-design of learning space allows learners to create their own context
- new and relevant learning contexts are generated by needs and questions arising in social interactions
- PAH continuum – pedagogy (cognitive mode), andragogy (metacognitive mode), heutagogy (epistemic mode)
