= Media democracy =

Democratic approach to media studies

Media democracy is a democratic approach to media studies that advocates for the reform of mass media to strengthen public service broadcasting and develop participation in alternative media and citizen journalism in order to create a mass media system that informs and empowers all members of society and enhances democratic values.

Media democracy is both a theory and a social movement. It is against concentration in the ownership of media, and it champions diversity of voices and perspectives within the news system.

== Definition ==
Media democracy focuses on the empowerment of individual citizens and on the promotion of democratic ideals through the spread of information. Additionally, the approach argues that the media system itself should be democratic in its own construction, shying away from private ownership or intense regulations. Media democracy entails that media should be used to promote democracy and that media itself should be democratic. For example, it views media ownership concentration as undemocratic and as being unable to promote democracy, and thus, as facet of media that must be examined critically. Both the concept and the social movements promoting it have grown in response to the increased corporate domination in mass media and perceived shrinking of the marketplace of ideas. It understands media as a tool with the power to reach a large audience with a central role in shaping culture.

The concept of a media democracy follows in response to the deregulation of broadcast markets and the concentration of mass media ownership. In the book Manufacturing Consent: The Political Economy of the Mass Media, authors Edward S. Herman and Noam Chomsky outline the propaganda model of media, which states that the private interests in control of media outlets shape news and information before it is disseminated to the public through the use of five information filters.

Media democracy gives people the right to participate in media. It extends the media's relationship to the public sphere, where the information gathered can be viewed and shared by the people. The relationship of media democracy and the public sphere extends to various types of media, such as social media and mainstream media, in order for people to communicate with one another through digital media and share the information they want to publish to the public.

The term also refers to a modern social movement evident in countries all over the world. It attempts to make mainstream media more accountable to the publics they serve and to create more democratic alternatives to current forms of mass media.

Media democracy advocates for:

- Replacing the current corporate media model with one that operates democratically, rather than for profit;
- Strengthening public service broadcasting;
- Incorporating the use of alternative media into the larger discourse;
- Increasing the role of citizen journalism;
- Turning a passive audience into active participants;
- Using the mass media to promote democratic ideals.

The competitive structure of the mass media landscape stands in opposition to democratic ideals since the competition of the marketplace affects how stories are framed and transmitted to the public. This can "hamper the ability of the democratic system to solve internal social problems as well as international conflicts in an optimal way."

Media democracy is grounded in creating a mass media system that favours a diversity of voices and opinions over ownership or consolidation, in an effort to eliminate bias in coverage. This, in turn, leads to the informed public debate necessary for a democratic state. The ability to comprehend and scrutinize the connection between press and democracy is important because media has the power to tell a society's stories and thereby influence thinking, beliefs and behaviour.

== Media ownership concentration ==
Cultural studies have investigated changes in the increasing tendency of modern mass media in the field of politics to blur and confuse the boundaries between journalism, entertainment, public relations and advertising. A diverse range of information providers is necessary so that viewers, readers and listeners receive a broad spectrum of information from varying sources that is not tightly controlled, biased and filtered. Access to different sources of information prevents deliberate attempts at misinformation and allows the public to make their own judgments and form their own opinions. This is critical as individuals must be in a position to decide and act autonomously for there to be a functioning democracy.

The last several decades have seen an increased concentration of media ownership by large private entities. In the United States, these organizations are known as the Big Six. They include: General Electric, Walt Disney Co., News Corporation, Time Warner, Viacom, and CBS Corporation. A similar approach has been taken in Canada, where most media outlets are owned by national conglomerates. This has led to a reduction in the number of voices and opinions communicated to the public; to an increase in the commercialization of news and information; a reduction in investigative reporting; and an emphasis on infotainment and profitability over informative public discourse.

The concentration of media outlets has been encouraged by government deregulation and neoliberal trade policies. In the United States, the Telecommunications Act of 1996 removed most of the media ownership rules that were previously put in place. This led to a massive consolidation of the telecommunications industry. Over 4,000 radio stations were bought out, and minority ownership in TV stations dropped to its lowest point since 1990 when the federal government began tracking the data.

Another aspect of the concentration of media ownership is the nature of the political economy that follows. Some media theorists argue that corporate interest is put forth, and that only the small cluster of media outlets have the privilege of controlling the information that the population can access. Moreover, media democracy claims that corporate ownership and commercial pressures influence media content, sharply limiting the range of news, opinions, and entertainment citizens receive. Consequently, they call for a more equal distribution of economic, social, cultural, and information capital, which would lead to a more informed citizenry, as well as a more enlightened, representative political discourse.

To counter media ownership concentration, advocates of media democracy support media diversification. For instance, they prefer local news sources, for they allow for a greater variety in the ideas being spread thanks to being outside the corporate economy, since diversity is at the root of a fair democracy.

== Internet media democracy ==
The World Wide Web, particularly Web 2.0, is seen as a powerful medium for facilitating the growth of a media democracy as it offers participants "a potential voice, a platform, and access to the means of production." The internet is being utilized as a medium for political activity and other pressing issues such as social, environmental, and economic problems []. Moreover, the utilization of the internet has allowed online users to participate in political discourse freely and increase their democratic presence online and in person.Users share information such as voting polls, dates, locations, and statistics, or information about protests and news that is not yet covered by the media.

The Arab Spring in the Middle East and North Africa, media was used for democratic purposes and uprisings. Social media sites like Facebook, Twitter, and YouTube allowed citizens to connect quickly, exchange information, and organize protests against their governments. While social media is not solely credited with the success of these protests, the technologies played an important role in instilling change in Tunisia, Egypt, and Libya. These acts show that a population can be informed through alternative media channels and adjust its behaviour accordingly. Individuals who did not have the facility to access these social media platforms were still able to observe news through satellite channels and other people who were able to connect online. Crowdfunded websites are also linked to a heightened spread of media democracy.

The Romanian Election of 2014 [] serves as an example of internet media democracy. During the elections, many took to social media to voice their opinions and share pictures of themselves at polling centres all around the world. This 2014 election is remembered as the first time in which virtual ambition and the use of social media translated positively and directly onto polling numbers. Many Romanians were actively campaigning online through social media platforms, specifically, Facebook, "As more than 7 million Romanians have profiles on at least one social network and more than 70% of that one were active daily, the campaign was focused on the development of the civic participation through internet social networks."

== Restriction in media ==
Restrictions in media may exist either directly or indirectly. Before internet usage of media, as well as social media, became prominent, ordinary citizens rarely had much control over media. Even as the usage of social media has increased, major corporations still maintain the primary control over media as they are acquiring more and more platforms that would be considered in public use today.

Media has been compared in the sense that it is the usage of media that determines how the content is considered, rather than the actual messages of the content. According to Alec Charles edited Media/Democracy, “It is not the press or television or the internet or even democracy itself that is good or bad. It is what we do with them that makes them so”.

The role government plays in media restrictions in media has been viewed with skepticism as well. The government involvement in media is possibly due to distrust between the government and media, as the government has criticized media before. Partial blame for distrust between the government and the public on both sides often goes to media as the public may feel as though there is false information though media and the government may feel as though media is giving the public false information.

These functions of media in the way that it exists is described in a review of Victor Pickard's book, America's Battle for Media Democracy: The Triumph of Corporate Libertarianism and the Future of Media Reform, where Josh Shepperd wrote, “If one approaches the historical question of media ownership from a public service model, the private emphasis of the system requires praise for its innovations and self-sustainability, but deserves deep interrogation for its largely uncontested claim that the system, as is, provides the best opportunity for social recognition”.

In his 2005 speech at the NASIG, Leif Utne states that media democracy is related to freedom of press because it contributes to the reciprocal exchange of desires and information between the press, the state, and the population.

== Normative roles of media in democracy ==
Monitorial role

The term is originally coined by Harold Lasswell who associated the monitorial role with surveillance, "observing an extended environment for relevant information about events, conditions, trends, and threats." This form of media democracy is organized through the scanning of the real world of people, status and events, and potentially relevant sources of information. Under the guidance of relevance, importance, and normative framework that regulates the public domain, such information is evaluated and verified. Staying alert and controlling political power. It provides information to individuals to make their own decisions. The monitorial role involves practices such as publishing reports, agendas, and threats, reporting political, social, and economic decisions, and shedding light to public opinion.

Facilitative role

Media democracy uses journalism as a means to improve the quality of public life and promote democratic forms. It serves as a glue to hold community together. And it also enhances the ability and desire to listen to others.

Radical role

Going to the "root" of power relations and inequality and exposing their negative impacts upon the quality of everyday life and the health of democracy.

Oppositional to commercial/mainstream media which tend to protect the interest of the powerful and fail to provide information that raises critical awareness and generated empowerment. Cultivating political advocacy motivates engaging in political social democracy.

Collaborative role

Collaboration between media and state is always open and transparent.

== Actual roles of media in democracy ==
There is widespread concern that the mass media and social media are not serving the role that a well-functioning democracy. For example, the media is in charge of broadcasting political news to truthfully inform the population, but those messages can have a double purpose (promoting the good of the population and advancing the politicians' career through public relations), which can make the journalists' work more difficult. There is a need for the public to be informed about certain issues whether it may be social, political, or environmental. The media is heavily credited for keeping the public informed and up-to-date with activity, however, throughout the 80's and 90's corporate media has taken over in providing this information.

== Feminism ==
Feminist media theories argue that the media cannot be considered truly inclusive or democratic if it continues relying on masculine concepts of impartiality and objectivity. They argue that creating a more inclusive and democratic media requires reconceptualizing how we define the news and its principles. According to some feminist media theorists, news is like fictional genres that impose order and interpretation on its materials by means of narrative. Consequently, the news narrative put forward presents only one angle of a much wider picture.

It is argued that the distinction between public and private information that underpins how we define valuable or appropriate news content is also a gendered concept. The feminist argument follows that the systematic subversion of private or subjective information excludes women's voices from the popular discourse. Further to this point, feminist media theorists argue there is an assumed sense of equality implicit in the definition of the public that ignores important differences between genders in terms of their perspectives. So while media democracy in practice as alternative or citizen journalism may allow for greater diversity, these theorists argue that women's voices are framed within a masculine structure of objectivity and rationalist thinking.

Despite this criticism, there is an acceptance among some theorists that the blurring of public and private information with the introduction of some new alternative forms of media production (as well as the increase in opportunities for interaction and user-generated content) may signal a positive shift towards a more democratic and inclusive media democracy. Some forms of media democracy in practice (as citizen or alternative journalism) are challenging journalism's central tenets (objectivity and impartiality) by rejecting the idea that it is possible to tell a narrative without bias and, more to the point, that it is socially or morally preferable.

== Activism ==
Media Democracy Day, OpenMedia, and NewsWatch Canada are all Canadian initiatives that strive for reforms in the media. They aim to give an equal voice to all interests. Others, such as the creators of the Indonesian television program Newsdotcom, focus on increasing the population's media literacy rate to make the people more critical of the news they consume.

== Criticism ==
The media has given political parties the tools to reach large numbers of people and inform them on key issues ranging from policies to elections. The media can be seen as an enabler for democracy; having better-educated voters would lead to a more legitimate government. However, critics such as Julian King have argued that malicious actors can easily hijack those same tools - both state and non-state - and use them as weapons against people. In the past few years, media has become a direct threat to democracy. Two organizations of the Omidyar Group, Democracy Fund and Omidyar Network assembled to establish the relationship between media and democracy. Their initial findings presented six ways that social media was a direct threat to democracy.

Many social media platforms, such as Facebook, utilize surveillance infrastructure to collect user data and micro-target populations with personalized advertisements. With users leaving digital footprints almost everywhere they go, social media platforms create portfolios of the user to target them with specific advertisements. This leads to the formation of "echo chambers, polarization and hyper-partisanship." Therefore, social media platforms create bubbles, which are forever growing, of one-sided information and opinions. These bubbles trap the users and diminish opportunities for a healthy discourse. A commonly known effect social media has on democracy is the "spread of false and/or misleading information". Disinformation and Misinformation is commonly, at scale, spread across social media by both state and private actors, mainly using bots. Each type poses a threat as it floods social media with multiple, competing realities shifting the truth, facts and evidence to the side. Social media follows an algorithm that converts popularity into legitimacy, this is the idea that likes or retweets create validity or mass support. In theory, it creates a distorted system of evaluating information and provides a false representation. It's further harder to distinguish who is a troll or a bot. Social media further allows for manipulation by "populist leaders, governments and fringe actors". "Populist" leaders use platforms such as Twitter, Instagram to communicate with their electorate. However, such platforms allow them to roam freely with no restrictions allowing them to silence the minority voice, showcase momentum for their views or creating the impression of approval. Finally, social media causes the disruption of the public square. Some social media platforms have user policies and technical features that enable unintended consequences, such as hate speech, terrorist appeals, sexual and racial harassment, thus discouraging any civil debates. This leads the targeted groups to opting out of participating in public discourse. as much as social media has made it easier for the public to receive and access news and entertainment from their devices it has been dangerous in terms of rapid spread of fake news (2019). the public is now easily accessible to those with the intend to spread disinformation information in order to harm and misled the public. those in authority, officials and the elite use their power to dominate the narratives on social media often times to gain their support and misled them.

== See also ==
- Democratic media
- Embedded journalism
- Free Press (organization)
- Media conglomerate
- Media Lens
- Media literacy
- mediatization, how media interact with society and democracy
- Media manipulation
- Outfoxed
- Participatory culture
- Prometheus Radio Project
- Save the Internet
- Social aspects of television
- National Conference for Media Reform
- Radical media
