= C. Edwin Baker =

Charles Edwin Baker
- Born: May 28, 1947
- Died: December 8, 2009 (aged 62)
- Occupation: Law professor
- Title: Nicholas F. Gallicchio Professor of Law and Communication

Academic background
- Education: Stanford University; Yale University

Academic work
- Institutions: University of Pennsylvania Law School
- Main interests: constitutional law, communications law, and free speech

Charles Edwin Baker (May 28, 1947 – December 8, 2009), the Nicholas F. Gallicchio Professor of Law and Communication at the University of Pennsylvania Law School, was a scholar of constitutional law, communications law, and free speech.

== Biography ==
Baker was considered one of the country's foremost authorities on the First Amendment and on mass media policy. His most recent scholarship focused on the economics of the news business, political philosophy, and jurisprudential questions concerning the egalitarian and libertarian bases of constitutional theory.

Baker was a native of Madisonville, Kentucky. He received his bachelor's degree from Stanford University and his J.D. degree from Yale Law School. He was a law and humanities fellow at Harvard University in 1974, a fellow at Harvard's Shorenstein Barone Center in 1992, and a Radcliffe fellow there in 2006.

Baker served as a staff attorney for the American Civil Liberties Union and was a professor at the University of Oregon and an assistant professor at the University of Toledo. He joined the University of Pennsylvania Law School in 1981, and since 2007 held a joint appointment at the Annenberg School for Communication at Penn. He was also a visiting professor at New York University, the University of Chicago, Cornell University, Harvard University, and the University of Texas.

Baker died on December 8, 2009, after he collapsed while exercising. Baker was survived by his sister, Nancy L. Baker a member of the faculty at Fielding Graduate University. He was predeceased by his parents, Falcon O. Baker Jr. and Ernestine Magagna Baker.

== Books ==
- Human Liberty and Freedom of Speech (Oxford, 1989) defends interpreting First Amendment freedom of speech as concerned primarily with individual freedom and autonomy rather than the more traditional understanding of it being about a marketplace of ideas
- Advertising and a Democratic Press (Princeton, 1994)
- Media, Markets, and Democracy (Cambridge, 2002), 2002 winner of the Donald McGannon Award for Social and Ethical Relevance in Communications Policy Research. This book has been translated into Chinese and a number of other languages.
- Media Concentration and Democracy: Why Ownership Matters (Cambridge, 2007)
