= Neil Henry (journalist) =

Neil Henry is an American journalist and professor who is a former dean of the University of California, Berkeley Graduate School of Journalism. He served as dean of the school between 2007 and 2011. During his deanship Henry accelerated the school's transition to digital skills training in its curriculum with the support of the Ford Foundation, while attracting three $2 million endowed faculty chairs from private donors. Henry earned the 2010 Distinguished Journalist award from the Bay Area Society of Professional Journalists for his work as dean of the school.

Before becoming a professor at Berkeley in 1993, Henry was a reporter for 16 years for The Washington Post, where he served as a local and national correspondent, and Africa Bureau Chief based in Nairobi, Kenya. A five-time Pulitzer Prize nominee for his work at the Post, he has been awarded honors from the Associated Press, the Robert F. Kennedy Memorial, and the John S. and John L. Knight Foundation for his reporting and writing.

While at the Post Henry specialized in investigations of social inequities, at times resorting to undercover reporting. In 1980, as the crisis in urban homelessness was just beginning, Henry spent three winter months sleeping in homeless shelters and religious missions, and eating in soup kitchens, to better gauge the scope of the homelessness problem and to get to know the life stories of the men who made up the population. Loosely inspired by George Orwell's classic novel, Henry's 12-part front page series was entitled "Down and Out in Baltimore and Washington."

Three years later, Henry went undercover again to investigate the plight of jobless, homeless men who were picked up from the streets of Washington, DC by underhanded work crew leaders and taken to North Carolina and other southern states to work in the fields picking tomatoes and tobacco. He joined them, and worked alongside them, and like them was exploited, severely underpaid and kept in poor housing conditions. The six-part front page series was entitled, "The Black Dispatch," the nickname some of the men had for the migrant vans that transported them from the city to the countryside.

While overseas for the Post as its Africa Bureau Chief, Henry covered countries in Sub-Saharan Africa from Sudan and Ethiopia in the north to South Africa. He reported on civil wars in Liberia, Sudan and Ethiopia and momentous political changes in numerous countries from Nigeria to Zambia.

The son of a surgeon and a public school librarian, Henry was born in Nashville and grew up in Seattle, where his parents settled in 1957 after escaping racial segregation and Jim Crow laws in the Deep South. He is the author of "Pearl's Secret", an autobiographical family history that explores issues of mixed African American and White American heritage. The book was a finalist for the title of best nonfiction book by the Bay Area Book Reviewers Association in 2001. He also is the author of 2007's "American Carnival: Journalism Under Siege in an Age of New Media," which examines the economic and cultural forces challenging the practice of journalism in the digital era.

Between 2012 until his retirement from the Berkeley faculty in 2016, Henry, a 1977 graduate in politics from Princeton University, and holder of a 1978 Master's Degree from Columbia University's Graduate School of Journalism, served as director of the Oral History Center of UC Berkeley's Bancroft Library.
