= National Conference for Media Reform =

Conference devoted to media, technology and democracy in the United States

The National Conference for Media Reform (NCMR) is the largest conference devoted to media technology and news in the United States. Sponsored and presented by the media reform organization Free Press, the conference brings together activists; students; policymakers; journalists; scholars; educators; media makers, and other concerned citizens who are working for better media, to share ideas and strategies, develop new skills, network and built momentum for the media reform movement.

Previous conferences were held in Madison, Wisconsin; St. Louis; Memphis, Tennessee; Minneapolis, Minnesota; Boston, Massachusetts; and Denver, Colorado.

== Past conferences ==
=== 2003 ===
The first NCMR was held in 2003 in Madison, Wisconsin, and was attended by more than 1700 people. Participants included Robert W. McChesney, Amy Goodman, Juan Gonzalez, Naomi Klein, Sherrod Brown Al Franken, Jeff Cohen, John Conyers, Jr., Charles Lewis, Bernie Sanders, Russ Feingold, Ralph Nader, Bill Moyers, and Jesse Jackson.

=== 2005 ===
The 2005 NCMR was held from May 13–15 in St. Louis, Missouri at the Millennium Hotel. More than 2000 people attended.

Booksigners included Amy Goodman, David Bollier, Laura Flanders, Eesha Williams, Victor Navasky, David Brock, Juan Gonzalez, Sut Jhally, John Nichols, Robert W. McChesney, Bob Hackett, Kembrew McLeod, Jerry Mander, Siva Vaidhyanathan, Peter Grant, Patti Smith, Al Franken, and Jim Hightower.

Over 100 presenters were featured, including Bill Moyers, Bill Fletcher Jr., Chellie Pingree, Jennifer Pozner, Robert Greenwald, Arianna Huffington, Janine Jackson, Naomi Klein, George Lakoff, Federal Communications Commission (FCC) Commissioners Jonathan Adelstein and Michael Copps, National Organization for Women President Kim Gandy, Representatives Maurice Hinchey (D-N.Y.), Bernie Sanders (I-Vt.), Jan Schakowsky (D-Ill.) and Diane Watson (D-Calif.)

=== 2007 ===
The 2007 NCMR was held in January in Memphis, Tennessee. Notable speakers included Bill Moyers; actors and activists Jane Fonda, Geena Davis, and Danny Glover; civil rights leaders Van Jones and Rev. Jesse Jackson; and policymakers Rep. Ed Markey, Sen. Bernie Sanders and FCC Commissioners Michael Copps and Jonathan Adelstein. About 3,000 people attended, according to the daily newspaper in Memphis.

=== 2008 ===
The 2008 NCMR was held on June 6–8 at the Minneapolis Convention Center, Minneapolis, Minnesota. The conference program's five themes were: media policy; media reform activism and movement building; journalism and independent media; civil rights-social justice and media; and media and democracy: the next frontier.

=== 2011 ===
The 2011 NCMR was held in Boston, Massachusetts. The fifth NCMR was held on April 8–10, 2011, at the Seaport World Trade Center in Boston. The event featured roughly 300 speakers and performers and an estimated 2,500 attendees. Presenters included Amy Goodman, Juan Gonzalez, Glenn Greenwald, Nancy Pelosi, Bernie Sanders, Bob Edgar, Robert W. McChesney, David Shuster, Carole Simpson, Katrina Vanden Heuvel and Jeff Cohen.

=== 2013 ===
The 2013 NCMR was held in Denver, Colorado. Thousands of people attended. Presenters included Amy Goodman, Robert W. McChesney, and Jeff Cohen.

== See also ==
- Free Press (organization), media reform, media activism
