= Objectivity and Liberal Scholarship =

Essay by Noam Chomsky

- First edition
- Author: Noam Chomsky
- Published: 1997
- Publisher: Red & Black
- Media type: Paperback
- Pages: 142
- ISBN: 978-0-93486-833-4

"Objectivity and Liberal Scholarship" is an essay by the American academic Noam Chomsky. It was first published as part of Chomsky's American Power and the New Mandarins. Parts of the essay were delivered as a lecture at New York University in March 1968, as part of Albert Schweitzer Lecture Series. The first third of the essay, "The Menace of Liberal Scholarship" by Noam Chomsky in The New York Review of Books, January 2, 1969, was taken "almost verbatim" from this essay.

== Content ==
In "Objectivity and Liberal Scholarship" Noam Chomsky argues that, during the Vietnam War, the liberal intelligentsia provided self-serving arguments in their discussion and analysis of the war, instead of objectively discussing the topic; that they used ideology to legitimize U.S. commitments to autocratic rule and intervention in Asia. Chomsky argues that there was no end of ideology, as many scholars opined, but rather that it was an elite ideology that all elites and scholars could agree upon. Chomsky argues that the conservative, moderate, and liberal intelligentsia all had an elite, counter-revolutionary, bias in their writing, but he focuses on the liberal scholars. As an additional example to the Vietnam War, Noam Chomsky looks at liberal scholarship which covered the Spanish Civil War in which the same lack of objectivity and the same counter-revolutionary subordination can be seen.

The essay consists of three parts. Part I focuses on the Vietnam War and the increasing role of intellectuals, or specialists, in government and public and foreign policy. Part II focuses on the Spanish Civil War. He contrasts the liberal-communist version of the war with that of other sources including anarchists' and first-hand accounts. Part III is a conclusion.
