= American Power and the New Mandarins =

Book by Noam Chomsky

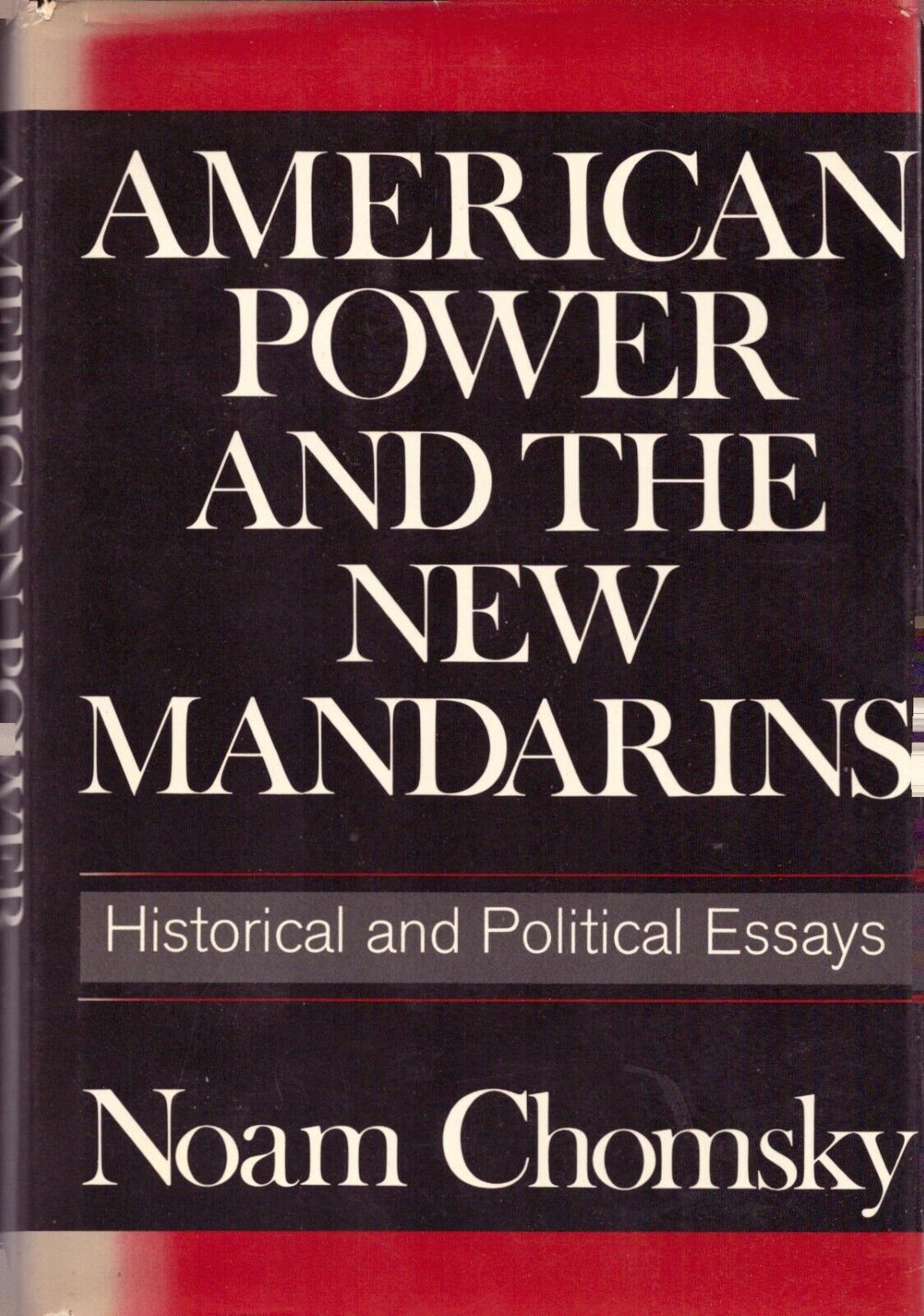
- First edition
- Author: Noam Chomsky
- Publisher: Pantheon Books, The New Press
- Publication date: 1969, 2002 (reprinted)
- Media type: Print (Paperback)
- Pages: 432
- ISBN: 1-56584-775-X
- OCLC: 50727554

American Power and the New Mandarins is a book by American academic Noam Chomsky. Largely written in 1968 and published in 1969, it was his first text focused on politics and sets out in detail his opposition to U.S. involvement in the Vietnam War.

== Overview ==
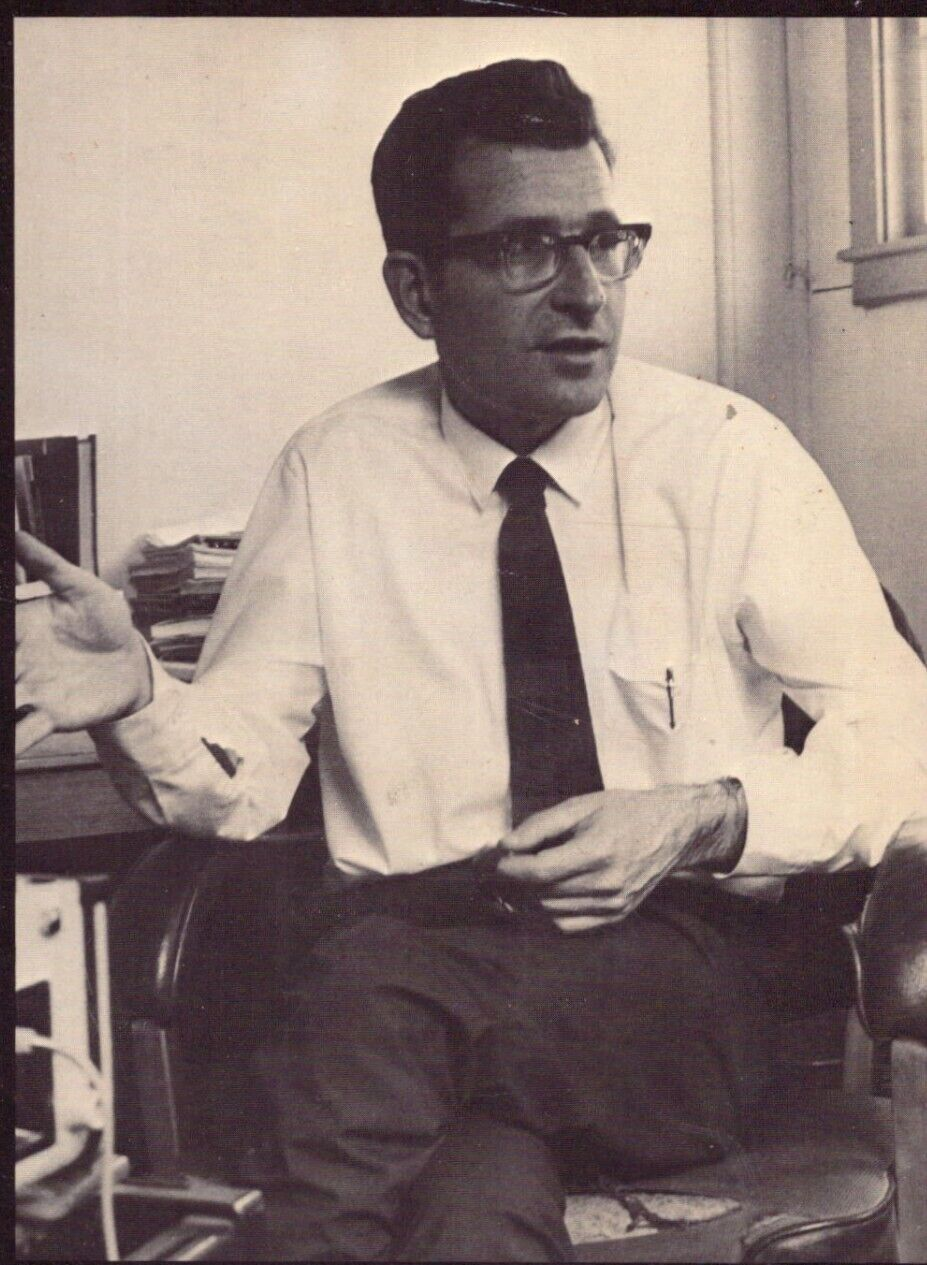
Portrait photograph of Noam Chomsky by W. U. S. van Lessen Kloeke featured on the back cover of the book, c. 1969

Chomsky develops the proposition, laid out in The Responsibility of Intellectuals, that the American intellectual and technical class, both in universities and in government (the "new mandarins"), bear major responsibility for the atrocities being perpetrated by the United States in Vietnam.

He argues that U.S. policy in Vietnam has been all too "successful." In his view, U.S. policy was to destroy the nationalist movements among the South Vietnamese peasantry rather than to defend South Vietnam from the military aggression of North Vietnam. He holds that the former was accomplished rather "successfully" at the expense of the latter.

His fundamental point on the new mandarins is that we should not uncritically accept the claim that technocratic approaches are neutral and beneficial. He writes: 'Quite generally, what grounds are there for supposing that those whose claim to power is based on knowledge and technique will be more benign in their exercise of power than those whose claim is based on wealth or aristocratic origin? On the contrary, one might expect the new mandarin to be dangerously arrogant, aggressive and incapable of adjusting to failure, as compared with his predecessor, whose claim to power was not diminished by honesty as to the limitations of his knowledge, lack of work to do or demonstrable mistakes.'

He also suggests that common presumptions about the greatness of the West and the modern age are misguided. He writes that these assumptions are created automatically regardless of real social conditions: 'one would expect any group with access to power and affluence to construct an ideology that will justify this state of affairs on the grounds of the general welfare.'

The book was reprinted by The New Press in 2002 and contains a new foreword by Howard Zinn, an American historian and the author of A People's History of the United States.

== Synopsis ==
Chomsky predicts that Vietnamese opposition to U.S. involvement in the conflict would continue and that the U.S. would be unable to defeat the Viet Cong. He explains that many of the chapters of this book originated as articles or lectures that he gave during his involvement in the still-ongoing anti-war movement. From a moralistic perspective, his primary insight in this work was that "by accepting the presumption of legitimacy of debate on certain issues, one has already lost one's humanity."

== Publication ==
- New York, Pantheon Books [1969]
- United Kingdom, Pelican Books [1969]
- New York, The New Press [2002]
