= Noam Chomsky =

American linguist and activist (born 1928)

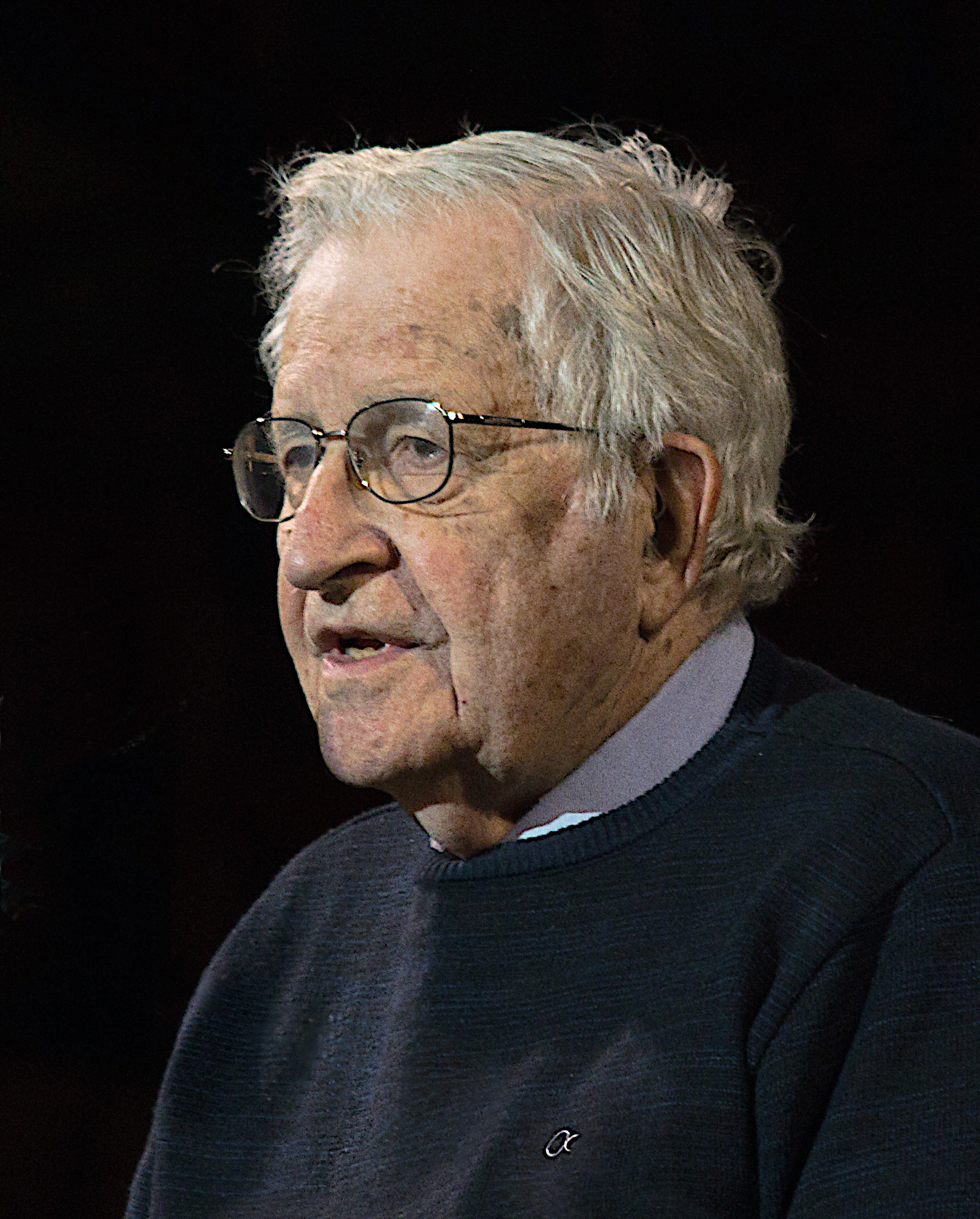
- Chomsky in 2017
- Born: Avram Noam Chomsky; December 7, 1928 (age 97); Philadelphia, Pennsylvania, US
- Occupations: Professor, public intellectual
- Years active: 1955–2023
- Spouses: Carol Schatz (m. 1949; died 2008) Valeria Wasserman (m. 2014)
- Children: 3, including Aviva
- Father: William Chomsky
- Awards: Guggenheim Fellowship (1971); Member of the National Academy of Sciences (1972); APA Award for Distinguished Scientific Contributions to Psychology (1984); Orwell Award (1987, 1989); Kyoto Prize in Basic Sciences (1988); Helmholtz Medal (1996); Benjamin Franklin Medal in Computer and Cognitive Science (1999); Sydney Peace Prize (2011); Nuclear Age Peace Foundation (2014)

Academic background
- Education: University of Pennsylvania (BA, MA, PhD)
- Thesis: Transformational Analysis (1955)
- Doctoral advisor: Zellig Harris
- Other advisor: Nelson Goodman
- Influences: Academic; J. L. Austin, William Chomsky, C. West Churchman, René Descartes, Galileo, Nelson Goodman, Morris Halle, Zellig Harris, Wilhelm von Humboldt, David Hume, Roman Jakobson, Immanuel Kant, George Armitage Miller, Pāṇini, Hilary Putnam, W. V. O. Quine, Bertrand Russell, Ferdinand de Saussure, Marcel-Paul Schützenberger, Alan Turing, Ludwig Wittgenstein Political; Mikhail Bakunin, Alex Carey, William Chomsky, John Dewey, Zellig Harris, Wilhelm von Humboldt, David Hume, Thomas Jefferson, Karl Korsch, Peter Kropotkin, Karl Liebknecht, Rosa Luxemburg, John Locke, Dwight Macdonald, Paul Mattick, John Stuart Mill, George Orwell, Anton Pannekoek, Pierre-Joseph Proudhon, Rudolf Rocker, Jean-Jacques Rousseau, Bertrand Russell, Diego Abad de Santillán, Adam Smith

Academic work
- Discipline: Linguistics, analytic philosophy, cognitive science, political criticism
- School or tradition: Anarcho-syndicalism, libertarian socialism
- Institutions: Massachusetts Institute of Technology; University of Arizona
- Doctoral students: Gülşat Aygen, Mark Baker, Jonathan Bobaljik, Joan Bresnan, Peter Culicover, Ray C. Dougherty, Janet Dean Fodor, John Goldsmith, C.-T. James Huang, Sabine Iatridou, Ray Jackendoff, Edward Klima, Jan Koster, Jaklin Kornfilt, S.-Y. Kuroda, Howard Lasnik, Robert Lees, Alec Marantz, Diane Massam, James D. McCawley, Jacques Mehler, Andrea Moro, Barbara Partee, David Perlmutter, David Pesetsky, Tanya Reinhart, John R. Ross, Ivan Sag, Edwin S. Williams, Deirdre Wilson
- Notable students: George Lakoff; Robert Stainton
- Notable works: Syntactic Structures (1957), The Responsibility of Intellectuals (1967), Counter-Revolutionary Violence: Bloodbaths in Fact & Propaganda (1973), Manufacturing Consent (1988), How the World Works (2011), Requiem for the American Dream (2017)
- Influenced: In academia; John Backus, Derek Bickerton, Julian C. Boyd, Daniel Dennett, Daniel Everett, Jerry Fodor, Gilbert Harman, Marc Hauser, Norbert Hornstein, Niels Kaj Jerne, Donald Knuth, Georges J. F. Köhler, Peter Ludlow, Colin McGinn, César Milstein, Steven Pinker, John Searle, Neil Smith, Crispin Wright In politics; Michael Albert, Julian Assange, Bono, Jean Bricmont, Hugo Chávez, Zack de la Rocha, Clinton Fernandes, Norman Finkelstein, Robert Fisk, Amy Goodman, Stephen Jay Gould, Glenn Greenwald, Christopher Hitchens, Naomi Klein, Kyle Kulinski, Michael Moore, John Nichols, Ann Nocenti, John Pilger, Harold Pinter, Arundhati Roy, Edward Said, Aaron Swartz
- Website: chomsky.info

Avram Noam Chomsky (Note: Pronounced /noʊm ˈtʃɒmski/ nohm CHOM-skee) (born December 7, 1928) is an American intellectual, philosopher, linguist, political activist, and social critic. Sometimes called "the father of modern linguistics", (Note: Fox 1998: "Mr. Chomsky ... is the father of modern linguistics and remains the field's most influential practitioner."; Tymoczko & Henle 2004, p. 101: "As the founder of modern linguistics, Noam Chomsky, observed, each of the following sequences of words is nonsense ..."; Tanenhaus 2016: "At 87, Noam Chomsky, the founder of modern linguistics, remains a vital presence in American intellectual life.") Chomsky is also a major figure in analytic philosophy and one of the founders of the field of cognitive science. He is a laureate professor of linguistics at the University of Arizona and an institute professor emeritus at the Massachusetts Institute of Technology (MIT).

Among the most cited living authors, Chomsky has written more than 150 books on topics such as linguistics, war, and politics. In addition to his work in linguistics, since the 1960s, Chomsky has been an influential voice on the American Left as a consistent critic of the foreign policy of the United States, contemporary capitalism, and corporatocracy.

Born to immigrant Ashkenazi Jews in Philadelphia, Chomsky developed an early interest in anarchism from alternative bookstores in New York City. He studied at the University of Pennsylvania. During his postgraduate work in the Harvard Society of Fellows, Chomsky developed the theory of transformational grammar for which he earned his doctorate in 1955. That year he began teaching at MIT, and in 1957 emerged as a significant figure in linguistics with his landmark work Syntactic Structures, which played a major role in remodeling the study of language.

From 1958 to 1959 Chomsky was a National Science Foundation fellow at the Institute for Advanced Study. He created or co-created the universal grammar theory, the generative grammar theory, the Chomsky hierarchy, and the minimalist program. Chomsky also played a pivotal role in the decline of linguistic behaviorism, and was particularly critical of the work of B. F. Skinner.

An outspoken opponent of U.S. involvement in the Vietnam War, which he saw as an act of American imperialism, in 1967 Chomsky rose to national attention for his anti-war essay "The Responsibility of Intellectuals". Becoming associated with the New Left, he was arrested multiple times for his activism and placed on President Richard Nixon's list of political opponents. As his work in linguistics gained prominence and influence during the 1960s, it fomented the linguistics wars. In collaboration with Edward S. Herman, Chomsky later articulated the propaganda model of media criticism in Manufacturing Consent, and worked to expose the Indonesian occupation of East Timor.

Chomsky's defense of unconditional freedom of speech, including that of Holocaust denial, generated significant controversy in the Faurisson affair of the 1980s. Chomsky's commentary on the Cambodian genocide and the Bosnian genocide also generated controversy. Since retiring from active teaching at MIT, he has continued his vocal political activism, including opposing the 2003 invasion of Iraq and supporting the Occupy movement. An anti-Zionist, Chomsky considers Israel's treatment of Palestinians to be worse than South African–style apartheid, and criticizes U.S. support for Israel.

Chomsky is widely recognized as having helped to spark the cognitive revolution in the human sciences, contributing to the development of a new cognitivistic framework for the study of language and the mind. Chomsky remains a leading critic of U.S. foreign policy, contemporary capitalism, U.S. involvement and Israel's role in the Israeli–Palestinian conflict, and mass media. Chomsky and his ideas remain highly influential in the anti-capitalist and anti-imperialist movements.

== Life ==
=== Childhood: 1928–1945 ===
Chomsky was born on December 7, 1928, in East Oak Lane, Philadelphia, Pennsylvania. His parents, William Chomsky and Elsie Simonofsky, were Ashkenazi Jewish immigrants. In 1913, William fled the Russian Empire, from what is now Ukraine, to escape conscription, and worked in Baltimore sweatshops and Hebrew elementary schools before attending college. Elsie emigrated from the region of what is present-day Belarus. Both parents' first language was Yiddish although it was taboo to speak it at home; his father spoke English with a foreign accent while his mother spoke a native New York City English dialect.

After moving to Philadelphia, William became principal of the Congregation Mikveh Israel religious school and joined the Gratz College faculty. He placed great emphasis on educating people so that they would be "well integrated, free and independent in their thinking, concerned about improving and enhancing the world, and eager to participate in making life more meaningful and worthwhile for all", a mission that shaped and was subsequently adopted by his son. Elsie, who also taught at Mikveh Israel, shared her leftist politics and care for social issues with her sons.

Chomsky's only sibling, David Eli Chomsky (1934–2021), worked as a cardiologist in Philadelphia. The brothers were close, though David was more easygoing while Noam could be very competitive. They were raised Jewish, learned Hebrew, and were regularly involved in discussing political theories of Zionism; the family was particularly influenced by the Left Zionist writings of Ahad Ha'am. The brothers faced antisemitism as children, particularly from Philadelphia's Irish and German communities.

Chomsky attended the independent, Deweyite Oak Lane Country Day School and Philadelphia's Central High School, where he excelled academically and joined various clubs and societies, but was troubled by the school's hierarchical and domineering teaching methods. He also attended Hebrew High School at Gratz College, where his father taught.

Chomsky has described his parents as "normal Roosevelt Democrats" with center-left politics, but relatives involved in the International Ladies' Garment Workers' Union exposed him to socialism and far-left politics. He was substantially influenced by his uncle and the Jewish leftists who frequented his New York City newspaper stand to debate current affairs. Chomsky himself often visited left-wing and anarchist bookstores when visiting his uncle in the city, voraciously reading political literature. He became absorbed in the story of the 1939 fall of Barcelona and suppression of the Spanish anarchosyndicalist movement, writing his first article on the topic at the age of 10. That he came to identify with anarchism first rather than another leftist movement, he described as a "lucky accident". Chomsky was firmly anti-Bolshevik by his early teens.

=== University: 1945–1955 ===
In 1945, at the age of 16, Chomsky began a general program of study at the University of Pennsylvania, where he explored philosophy, logic, and languages and developed a primary interest in learning Arabic. Living at home, he funded his undergraduate degree by teaching Hebrew. Frustrated with his experiences at the university, he considered dropping out and moving to a kibbutz in Mandatory Palestine, but his intellectual curiosity was reawakened through conversations with the linguist Zellig Harris, whom he first met in a political circle in 1947. Harris introduced Chomsky to the field of theoretical linguistics and convinced him to major in the subject. Chomsky's BA honors thesis, "Morphophonemics of Modern Hebrew", applied Harris's methods to the language. Chomsky revised this thesis for his MA, which he received from the University of Pennsylvania in 1951; it was subsequently published as a book. He also developed his interest in philosophy while at university, in particular under the tutelage of Nelson Goodman.

From 1951 to 1955, Chomsky was a member of the Society of Fellows at Harvard University, where he undertook research on what became his doctoral dissertation. Having been encouraged by Goodman to apply, Chomsky was attracted to Harvard in part because the philosopher Willard Van Orman Quine was based there. Both Quine and a visiting philosopher, J. L. Austin of the University of Oxford, strongly influenced Chomsky. In 1952, Chomsky published his first academic article in The Journal of Symbolic Logic. Highly critical of the established behaviorist currents in linguistics, in 1954, he presented his ideas at lectures at the University of Chicago and Yale University. He had not been registered as a student at Pennsylvania for four years, but in 1955 he submitted a thesis setting out his ideas on transformational grammar; he was awarded a Doctor of Philosophy degree for it, and it was privately distributed among specialists on microfilm before being published in 1975 as part of The Logical Structure of Linguistic Theory. Harvard professor George Armitage Miller was impressed by Chomsky's thesis and collaborated with him on several technical papers in mathematical linguistics. Chomsky's doctorate exempted him from compulsory military service, which was otherwise due to begin in 1955.

In 1947, Chomsky began a romantic relationship with Carol Doris Schatz, whom he had known since early childhood. They married in 1949. After Chomsky was made a Fellow at Harvard, the couple moved to the Allston area of Boston and remained there until 1965, when they relocated to the suburb of Lexington. The couple took a Harvard travel grant to Europe in 1953. He enjoyed living in Hashomer Hatzair's HaZore'a kibbutz while in Israel, but was appalled by his interactions with Jewish nationalism, anti-Arab racism and, within the kibbutz's leftist community, Stalinism. On visits to New York City, Chomsky continued to frequent the office of the Yiddish anarchist journal Fraye Arbeter Shtime and became enamored with the ideas of Rudolf Rocker, a contributor whose work introduced Chomsky to the link between anarchism and classical liberalism. Chomsky also read other political thinkers: the anarchists Mikhail Bakunin and Diego Abad de Santillán, democratic socialists George Orwell, Bertrand Russell, and Dwight Macdonald, and works by Marxists Karl Liebknecht, Karl Korsch, and Rosa Luxemburg. His politics were reaffirmed by Orwell's depiction of Barcelona's functioning anarchist society in Homage to Catalonia (1938). Chomsky read the leftist journal Politics, which furthered his interest in anarchism, and the council communist periodical Living Marxism, though he rejected the Marxist orthodoxy of its editor, Paul Mattick.

=== Early career: 1955–1966 ===
Chomsky befriended two linguists at the Massachusetts Institute of Technology (MIT)—Morris Halle and Roman Jakobson—the latter of whom secured him an assistant professor position there in 1955. At MIT, Chomsky spent half his time on a mechanical translation project and half teaching a course on linguistics and philosophy. He described MIT as open to experimentation where he was free to pursue his idiosyncratic interests. MIT promoted him to the position of associate professor in 1957, and over the next year he was also a visiting professor at Columbia University. The Chomskys had their first child, Aviva, that same year. He also published his first book on linguistics, Syntactic Structures, a work that radically opposed the dominant Harris–Bloomfield trend in the field. Responses to Chomsky's ideas ranged from indifference to hostility, and his work proved divisive and caused "significant upheaval" in the discipline. The linguist John Lyons later asserted that Syntactic Structures "revolutionized the scientific study of language". From 1958 to 1959 Chomsky was a National Science Foundation fellow at the Institute for Advanced Study in Princeton, New Jersey.

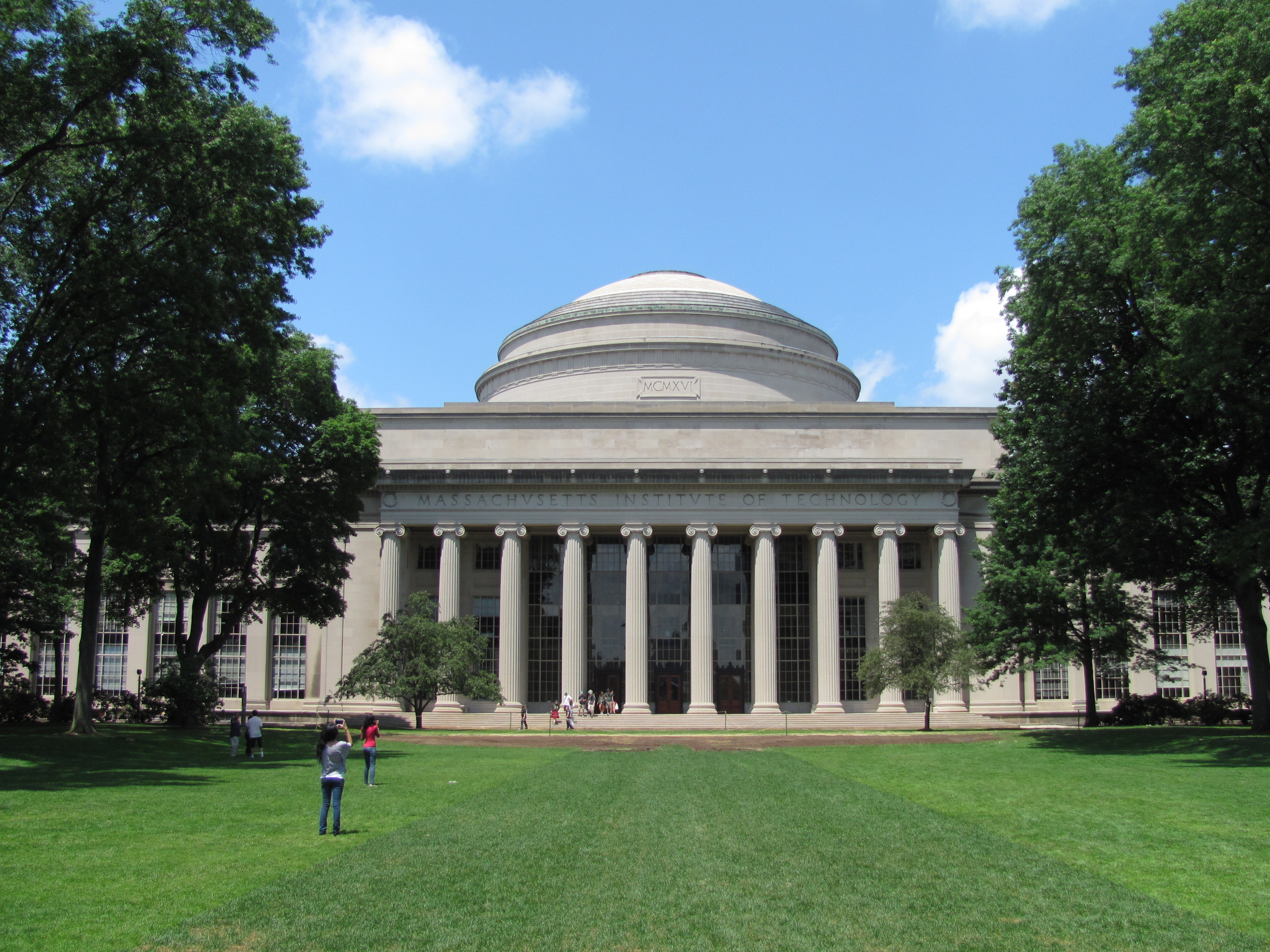
The Great Dome at the Massachusetts Institute of Technology (MIT); Chomsky began working at MIT in 1955.

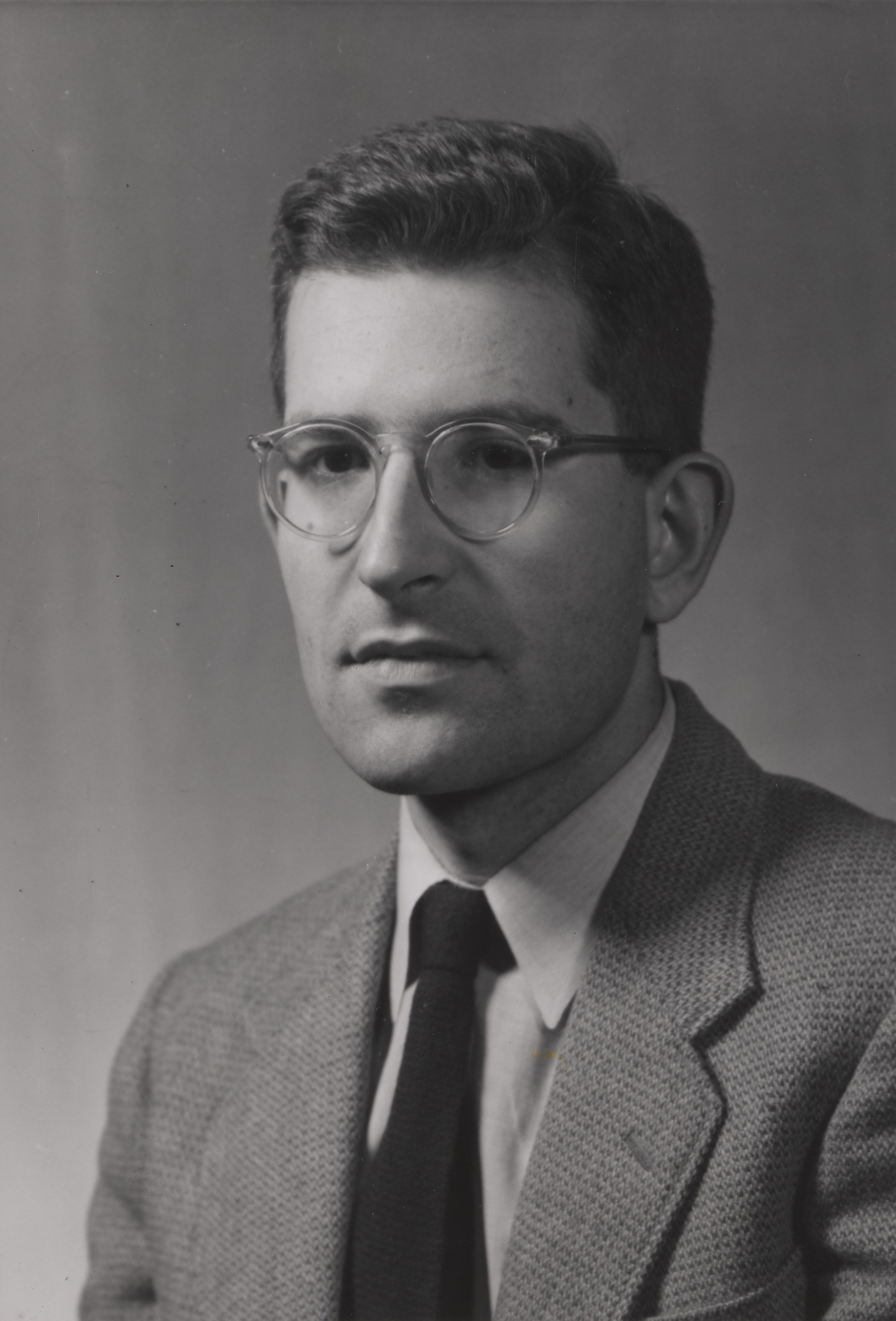
Portrait of Chomsky, c. 1961

Chomsky's provocative critique of B. F. Skinner, who viewed language as entirely learned behavior, and that critique's challenge to the dominant behaviorist paradigm thrust Chomsky into the limelight. Chomsky argued that behaviorism underplayed the role of human creativity in learning language and overplayed the role of external conditions in influencing verbal behavior. He proceeded to found MIT's graduate program in linguistics with Halle. In 1961, Chomsky received tenure and became a full professor in the Department of Modern Languages and Linguistics. He was appointed plenary speaker at the Ninth International Congress of Linguists, held in 1962 in Cambridge, Massachusetts, which established him as the de facto spokesperson of American linguistics. Between 1963 and 1965 he consulted on a military-sponsored project to teach computers to understand natural English commands from military generals.

Chomsky continued to publish his linguistic ideas throughout the decade, including in Aspects of the Theory of Syntax (1965), Topics in the Theory of Generative Grammar (1966), and Cartesian Linguistics: A Chapter in the History of Rationalist Thought (1966). Along with Halle, he also edited the Studies in Language series of books for Harper and Row. As he began to accrue significant academic recognition and honors for his work, Chomsky lectured at the University of California, Berkeley, in 1966. These lectures were published as Language and Mind in 1968. In the late 1960s, a high-profile intellectual rift later known as the linguistic wars developed between Chomsky and some of his colleagues and doctoral students—including Paul Postal, John Ross, George Lakoff, and James D. McCawley—who contended that Chomsky's syntax-based, interpretivist linguistics did not properly account for semantic context (general semantics). A post hoc assessment of this period concluded that the opposing programs ultimately were complementary, each informing the other.

=== Anti-war activism and dissent: 1967–1975 ===
[I]t does not require very far-reaching, specialized knowledge to perceive that the United States was invading South Vietnam. And, in fact, to take apart the system of illusions and deception which functions to prevent understanding of contemporary reality [is] not a task that requires extraordinary skill or understanding. It requires the kind of normal skepticism and willingness to apply one's analytical skills that almost all people have and that they can exercise.

— Chomsky on the Vietnam War

Chomsky joined protests against U.S. involvement in the Vietnam War in 1962, speaking on the subject at small gatherings in churches and homes. His 1967 critique of U.S. involvement, "The Responsibility of Intellectuals", among other contributions to The New York Review of Books, debuted Chomsky as a public dissident. This essay and other political articles were collected and published in 1969 as part of Chomsky's first political book, American Power and the New Mandarins. He followed this with further political books, including At War with Asia (1970), The Backroom Boys (1973), For Reasons of State (1973), and Peace in the Middle East? (1974), published by Pantheon Books. These publications led to Chomsky's association with the American New Left movement, though he thought little of prominent New Left intellectuals Herbert Marcuse and Erich Fromm and preferred the company of activists to that of intellectuals. Chomsky remained largely ignored by the mainstream press throughout this period.

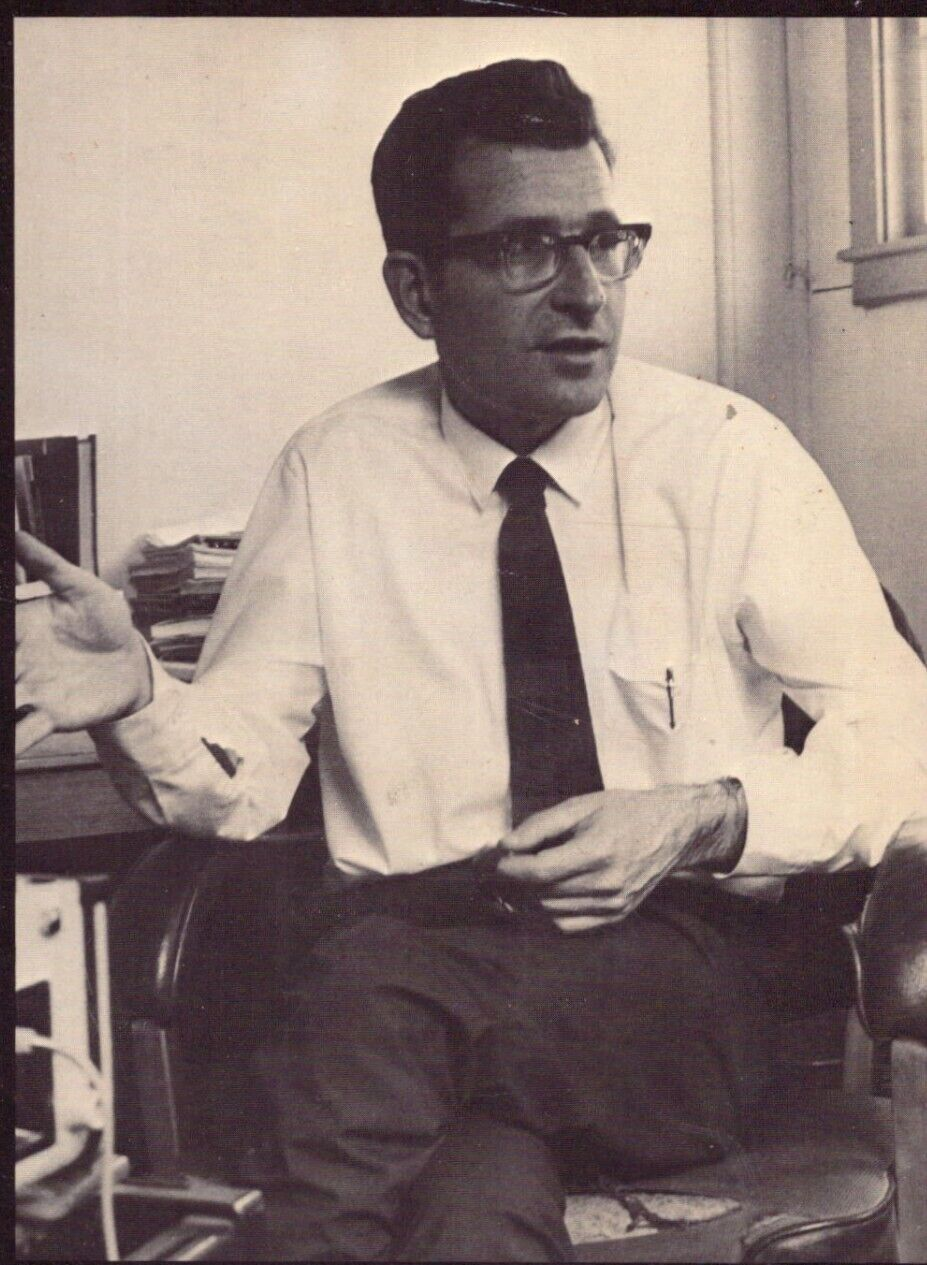
Portrait of Noam Chomsky, c. 1969

Chomsky also became involved in left-wing activism. Chomsky refused to pay half his taxes, publicly supported students who refused the draft, and was arrested while participating in an anti-war teach-in outside the Pentagon. During this time, Chomsky co-founded the anti-war collective RESIST with Hans Koning, Mitchell Goodman, Denise Levertov, William Sloane Coffin, and Dwight Macdonald. Although he questioned the objectives of the 1968 student protests, Chomsky regularly gave lectures to student activist groups and, with his colleague Louis Kampf, ran undergraduate courses on politics at MIT independently of the conservative-dominated political science department. When student activists campaigned to stop weapons and counterinsurgency research at MIT, Chomsky was sympathetic but felt that the research should remain under MIT's oversight and limited to systems of deterrence and defense. Chomsky has acknowledged that his MIT lab's funding at this time came from the military. He later said he considered resigning from MIT during the Vietnam War. There has since been a wide-ranging debate about what effects Chomsky's employment at MIT had on his political and linguistic ideas.

External images
- Chomsky participating in the anti-Vietnam War March on the Pentagon, October 21, 1967
- Chomsky with other public figures
- The protesters passing the Lincoln Memorial en route to the Pentagon

Chomsky's anti-war activism led to his arrest on multiple occasions and he was on President Richard Nixon's master list of political opponents. Chomsky was aware of the potential repercussions of his civil disobedience, and his wife began studying for her own doctorate in linguistics to support the family in the event of Chomsky's imprisonment or joblessness. Chomsky's scientific reputation insulated him from administrative action based on his beliefs. In 1970 he visited southeast Asia to lecture at Vietnam's Hanoi University of Science and Technology and toured war refugee camps in Laos. In 1973 he helped lead a committee commemorating the 50th anniversary of the War Resisters League.

Chomsky's work in linguistics continued to gain international recognition as he received multiple honorary doctorates. He delivered public lectures at the University of Cambridge, Columbia University (Woodbridge Lectures), and Stanford University. His appearance in a 1971 debate with French continental philosopher Michel Foucault positioned Chomsky as a symbolic figurehead of analytic philosophy. He continued to publish extensively on linguistics, producing Studies on Semantics in Generative Grammar (1972), an enlarged edition of Language and Mind (1972), and Reflections on Language (1975). In 1974 Chomsky became a corresponding fellow of the British Academy.

=== Edward S. Herman and the Faurisson affair: 1976–1980 ===
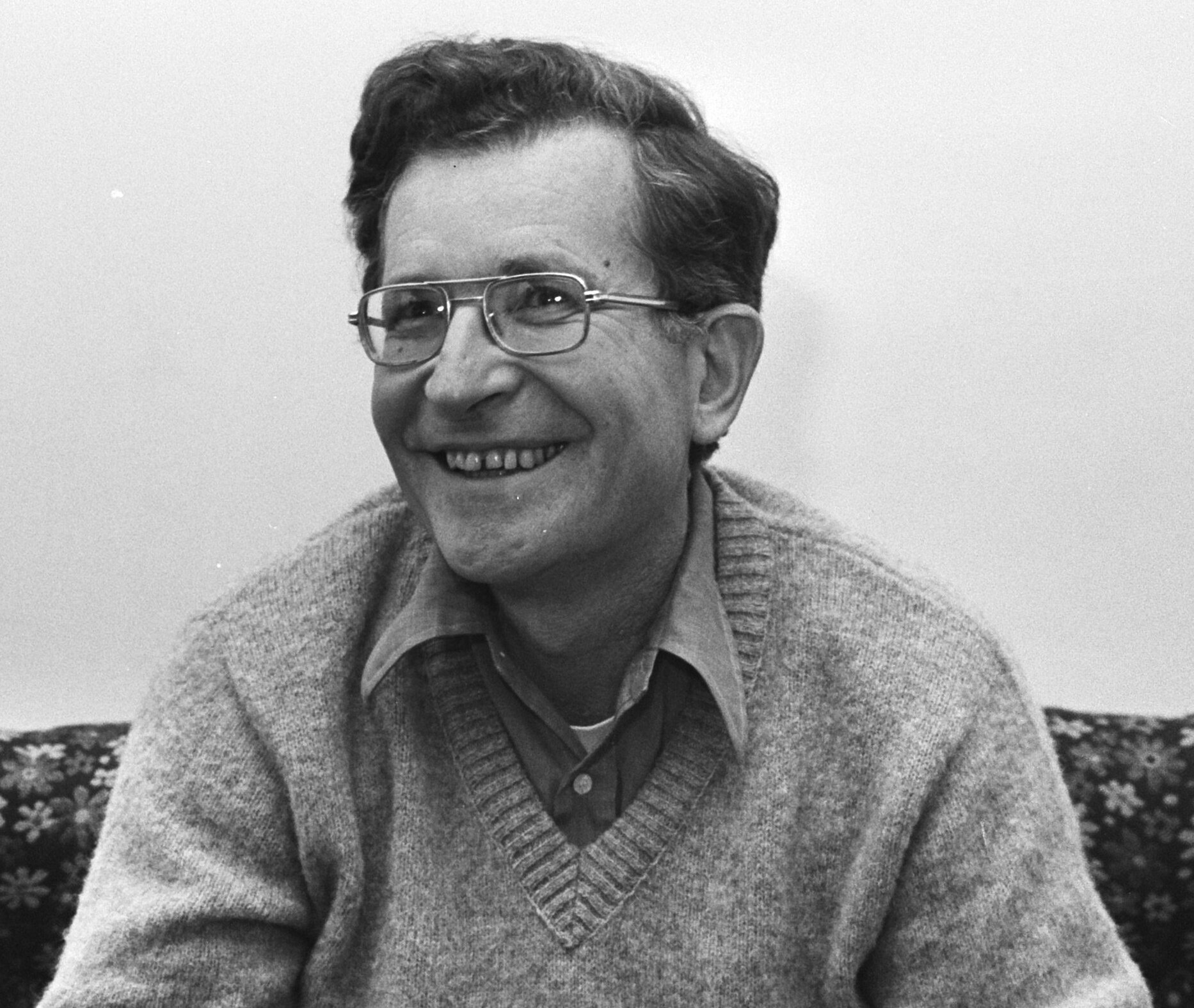
Chomsky in 1977

In the late 1970s and 1980s, Chomsky's linguistic publications expanded and clarified his earlier work, addressing his critics and updating his grammatical theory. His political talks often generated considerable controversy, particularly when he criticized the Israeli government and military. In the early 1970s Chomsky began collaborating with Edward S. Herman, who had also published critiques of the U.S. war in Vietnam. Together they wrote Counter-Revolutionary Violence: Bloodbaths in Fact & Propaganda, a book that criticized U.S. military involvement in Southeast Asia and the mainstream media's failure to cover it. Warner Modular published it in 1973, but its parent company disapproved of the book's contents and ordered all copies destroyed.

While mainstream publishing options proved elusive, Chomsky found support from Michael Albert's South End Press, an activist-oriented publishing company. In 1979, South End published Chomsky and Herman's revised Counter-Revolutionary Violence as the two-volume The Political Economy of Human Rights, which compares U.S. media reactions to the Cambodian genocide and the Indonesian occupation of East Timor. It argues that because Indonesia was a U.S. ally, U.S. media ignored the East Timorese situation while focusing on events in Cambodia, a U.S. enemy. Chomsky's response included two testimonials before the United Nations' Special Committee on Decolonization, successful encouragement for American media to cover the occupation, and meetings with refugees in Lisbon. Marxist academic Steven Lukes most prominently publicly accused Chomsky of betraying his anarchist ideals and acting as an apologist for Cambodian leader Pol Pot. Herman said that the controversy "imposed a serious personal cost" on Chomsky, who considered the personal criticism less important than the evidence that "mainstream intelligentsia suppressed or justified the crimes of their own states".

Chomsky had long publicly criticized Nazism, and totalitarianism more generally, but his commitment to freedom of speech led him to defend the right of French historian Robert Faurisson to advocate a position widely characterized as Holocaust denial. Without Chomsky's knowledge, his plea for Faurisson's freedom of speech was published as the preface to the latter's 1980 book Mémoire en défense contre ceux qui m'accusent de falsifier l'histoire. Chomsky was widely condemned for defending Faurisson, and France's mainstream press accused Chomsky of being a Holocaust denier himself, refusing to publish his rebuttals to their accusations. Critiquing Chomsky's position, sociologist Werner Cohn later published an analysis of the affair titled Partners in Hate: Noam Chomsky and the Holocaust Deniers. The Faurisson affair had a lasting, damaging effect on Chomsky's career, especially in France.

=== Critique of propaganda and international affairs ===
External videos
- Manufacturing Consent: Noam Chomsky and the Media, a 1992 documentary exploring Chomsky's work of the same name and its impact

In 1985, during the Nicaraguan Contra War—in which the U.S. supported the contra militia against the Sandinista government—Chomsky traveled to Managua to meet with workers' organizations and refugees of the conflict, giving public lectures on politics and linguistics. Many of these lectures were published in 1987 as On Power and Ideology: The Managua Lectures. In 1983 he published The Fateful Triangle, which argued that the U.S. had continually used the Israeli–Palestinian conflict for its own ends. In 1988, Chomsky visited the Palestinian territories to witness the impact of Israeli occupation.

Chomsky and Herman's Manufacturing Consent: The Political Economy of the Mass Media (1988) outlines their propaganda model for understanding mainstream media. Even in countries without official censorship, they argued, the news is censored through five filters that greatly influence both what and how news is presented. The book received a 1992 film adaptation. In 1989, Chomsky published Necessary Illusions: Thought Control in Democratic Societies, in which he suggests that a worthwhile democracy requires that its citizens undertake intellectual self-defense against the media and elite intellectual culture that seeks to control them. By the 1980s, Chomsky's students had become prominent linguists who, in turn, expanded and revised his linguistic theories.

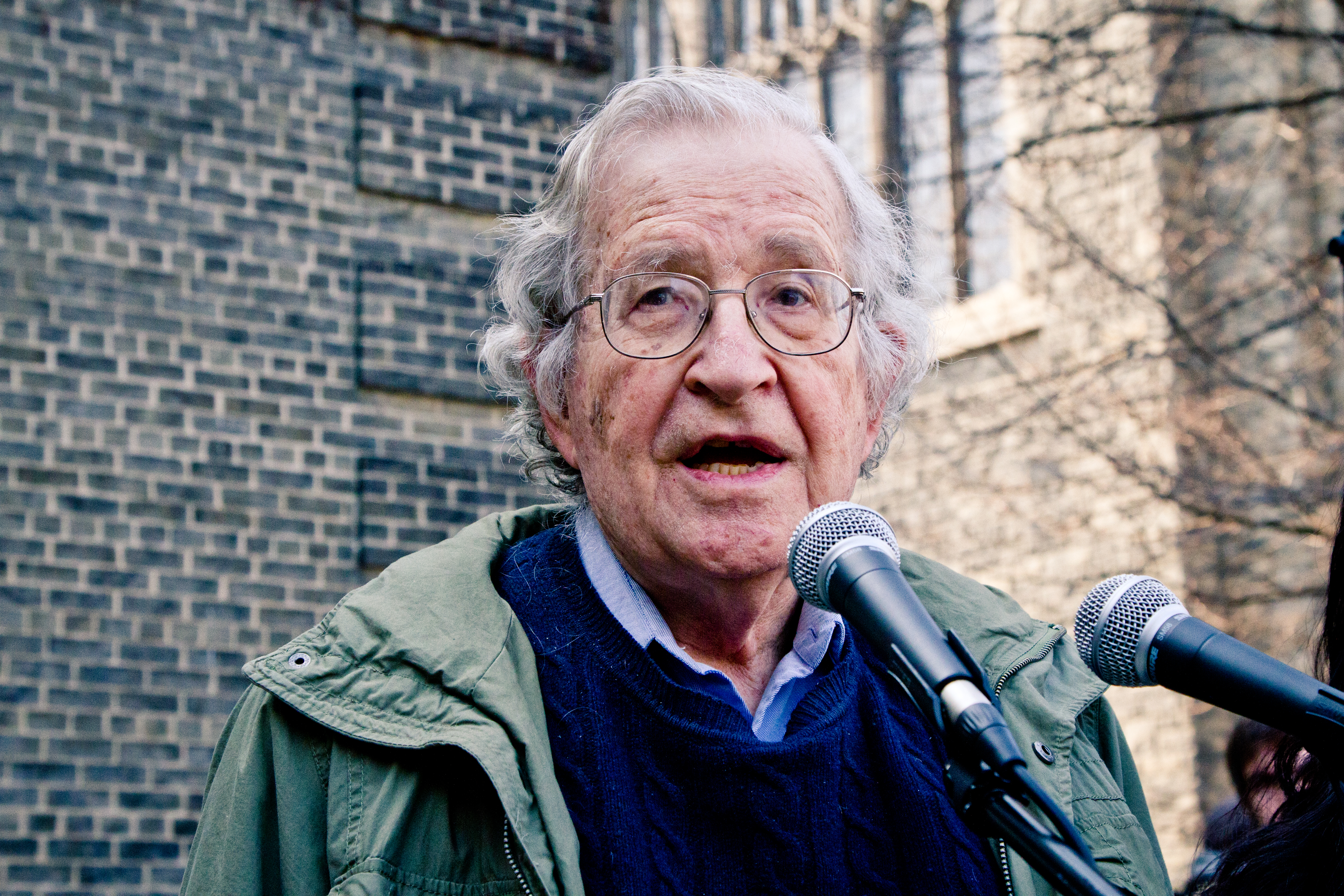
Chomsky speaking in support of the Occupy movement in 2011

In the 1990s, Chomsky embraced political activism to a greater degree than before. Retaining his commitment to the cause of East Timorese independence, in 1995 he visited Australia to talk on the issue at the behest of the East Timorese Relief Association and the National Council for East Timorese Resistance. The lectures he gave on the subject were published as Powers and Prospects in 1996. As a result of the international publicity Chomsky generated, his biographer Wolfgang Sperlich opined that he did more to aid the cause of East Timorese independence than anyone but the investigative journalist John Pilger. After East Timor attained independence from Indonesia in 1999, the Australian-led International Force for East Timor arrived as a peacekeeping force; Chomsky was critical of this, believing it was designed to secure Australian access to East Timor's oil and gas reserves under the Timor Gap Treaty.

Chomsky was widely interviewed after the September 11 attacks in 2001 as the American public attempted to make sense of the attacks. He argued that the ensuing war on terror was not a new development but a continuation of U.S. foreign policy and concomitant rhetoric since at least the Reagan era. He gave the D.T. Lakdawala Memorial Lecture in New Delhi in 2001, and in 2003 visited Cuba at the invitation of the Latin American Association of Social Scientists. Chomsky's 2003 Hegemony or Survival articulated what he called the United States' "imperial grand strategy" and critiqued the Iraq War and other aspects of the war on terror. Chomsky toured internationally with greater regularity during this period.

=== Retirement ===
Chomsky retired from MIT in 2002, but continued to conduct research and seminars on campus as an emeritus. That same year he visited Turkey to attend the trial of a publisher who had been accused of treason for printing one of Chomsky's books; Chomsky insisted on being a co-defendant and amid international media attention, the Security Courts dropped the charge on the first day. During that trip Chomsky visited Kurdish areas of Turkey and spoke out in favor of the Kurds' human rights. A supporter of the World Social Forum, he attended its conferences in Brazil in both 2002 and 2003, also attending the Forum event in India.

Chomsky discussing ecology, ethics and anarchism in 2014

Chomsky supported the 2011 Occupy movement, speaking at encampments and publishing on the movement, which he called a reaction to a 30-year class war. The 2015 documentary Requiem for the American Dream summarizes his views on capitalism and economic inequality through a "75-minute teach-in".

In 2015, Chomsky and his wife purchased a residence in São Paulo, Brazil, and began splitting their time between Brazil and the U.S. Chomsky taught a short-term politics course at the University of Arizona in 2017. He was later hired as the Agnese Nelms Haury Chair in the Agnese Nelms Haury Program in Environment and Social Justice, a part-time professorship in the linguistics department with duties including teaching and public seminars. His salary was covered by philanthropic donations. After a stroke in June 2023, Chomsky moved to Brazil full-time.

== Linguistic theory ==
What started as purely linguistic research ... has led, through involvement in political causes and an identification with an older philosophic tradition, to no less than an attempt to formulate an overall theory of man. The roots of this are manifest in the linguistic theory ... The discovery of cognitive structures common to the human race but only to humans (species specific), leads quite easily to thinking of unalienable human attributes.

— Edward Marcotte on the significance of Chomsky's linguistic theory

The basis of Chomsky's linguistic theory lies in biolinguistics, the linguistic school that holds that the principles underpinning the structure of language are biologically preset in the human mind and hence genetically inherited. He argues that all humans share the same underlying linguistic structure, irrespective of sociocultural differences. In adopting this position Chomsky rejects the radical behaviorist psychology of B. F. Skinner, who viewed speech, thought, and all behavior as a completely learned product of the interactions between organisms and their environments. Accordingly, Chomsky argues that language is a unique evolutionary development of the human species and distinguished from modes of communication used by any other animal species. Chomsky argues that his nativist, internalist view of language is consistent with the philosophical school of "rationalism" and contrasts with the anti-nativist, externalist view of language consistent with the philosophical school of "empiricism", which contends that all knowledge, including language, comes from external stimuli. Historians have disputed Chomsky's claim about rationalism on the basis that his theory of innate grammar excludes propositional knowledge and instead focuses on innate learning capacities or structures.

=== Universal grammar ===
Since the 1960s, Chomsky has maintained that syntactic knowledge is partially inborn, implying that children need only learn certain language-specific features of their native languages. He bases his argument on observations about human language acquisition and describes a "poverty of the stimulus": an enormous gap between the linguistic stimuli to which children are exposed and the rich linguistic competence they attain. For example, although children are exposed to only a very small and finite subset of the allowable syntactic variants within their first language, they somehow acquire the highly organized and systematic ability to understand and produce an infinite number of sentences, including ones that have never before been uttered, in that language. To explain this, Chomsky proposed that the primary linguistic data must be supplemented by an innate linguistic capacity. Furthermore, while a human baby and a kitten are both capable of inductive reasoning, if they are exposed to exactly the same linguistic data, the human will always acquire the ability to understand and produce language, while the kitten will never acquire either ability. Chomsky referred to this difference in capacity as the language acquisition device, and suggested that linguists needed to determine both what that device is and what constraints it imposes on the range of possible human languages. The universal features that result from these constraints would constitute "universal grammar". Multiple researchers have challenged universal grammar on the grounds of the evolutionary infeasibility of its genetic basis for language, the lack of crosslinguistic surface universals, and the unproven link between innate/universal structures and the structures of specific languages. Michael Tomasello has challenged Chomsky's theory of innate syntactic knowledge as based on theory and not behavioral observation. The empirical basis of poverty of the stimulus arguments has been challenged by Geoffrey Pullum and others, leading to back-and-forth debate in the language acquisition literature. Recent work has also suggested that some recurrent neural network architectures can learn hierarchical structure without an explicit constraint.

=== Generative grammar ===
Chomsky is generally credited with launching the research tradition of generative grammar, which aims to explain the cognitive basis of language by formulating and testing explicit models of humans' subconscious grammatical knowledge. Generative grammar proposes models of language consisting of explicit rule systems, which make testable falsifiable predictions. The goal of generative grammar is sometimes described as answering the question "What is that that you know when you know a language?"

Within generative grammar, Chomsky's initial model was called transformational grammar. Chomsky developed transformational grammar in the mid-1950s, whereupon it became the dominant syntactic theory in linguistics for two decades. "Transformations" are syntactic rules that derive surface structure from deep structure, which was often considered to reflect the structure of meaning. Transformational grammar later developed into the 1980s government and binding theory and thence into the minimalist program. This research focused on the principles and parameters framework, which explained children's ability to learn any language by filling open parameters (a set of universal grammar principles) that adapt as the child encounters linguistic data. The minimalist program, initiated by Chomsky, asks which minimal principles and parameters theory fits most elegantly, naturally, and simply.

Set inclusions described by the Chomsky hierarchy

Chomsky is commonly credited with inventing transformational-generative grammar, but his original contribution was considered modest when he first published his theory. In his 1955 dissertation and his 1957 textbook Syntactic Structures, he presented recent developments in the analysis formulated by Zellig Harris, who was Chomsky's PhD supervisor, and by Charles F. Hockett. (Note: Smith 2004, pp. 107 "Chomsky's early work was renowned for its mathematical rigor and he made some contribution to the nascent discipline of mathematical linguistics, in particular the analysis of (formal) languages in terms of what is now known as the Chomsky hierarchy."; Koerner 1983, pp. 159: "Characteristically, Harris proposes a transfer of sentences from English to Modern Hebrew ... Chomsky's approach to syntax in Syntactic Structures and several years thereafter was not much different from Harris's approach, since the concept of 'deep' or 'underlying structure' had not yet been introduced. The main difference between Harris (1954) and Chomsky (1957) appears to be that the latter is dealing with transfers within one single language only") Their method derives from the work of the structural linguist Louis Hjelmslev, who introduced algorithmic grammar to general linguistics. (Note: Koerner 1978, pp. 41f: "it is worth noting that Chomsky cites Hjelmslev's Prolegomena, which had been translated into English in 1953, since the authors' theoretical argument, derived largely from logic and mathematics, exhibits noticeable similarities."; Seuren 1998, pp. 166: "Both Hjelmslev and Harris were inspired by the mathematical notion of an algorithm as a purely formal production system for a set of strings of symbols. ... it is probably accurate to say that Hjelmslev was the first to try and apply it to the generation of strings of symbols in natural language"; Hjelmslev 1969 Prolegomena to a Theory of Language. Danish original 1943; first English translation 1954.) Based on this rule-based notation of grammars, Chomsky grouped logically possible phrase-structure grammar types into a series of four nested subsets and increasingly complex types, together known as the Chomsky hierarchy. This classification remains relevant to formal language theory and theoretical computer science, especially programming language theory, compiler construction, and automata theory. Chomsky's Syntactic Structures became, beyond generative linguistics as such, a catalyst for connecting what in Hjelmslev's and Jespersen's time was the beginnings of structural linguistics, which has become cognitive linguistics.

== Political views ==
The second major area to which Chomsky has contributed—and surely the best known in terms of the number of people in his audience and the ease of understanding what he writes and says—is his work on sociopolitical analysis; political, social, and economic history; and critical assessment of current political circumstance. In Chomsky's view, although those in power might—and do—try to obscure their intentions and to defend their actions in ways that make them acceptable to citizens, it is easy for anyone who is willing to be critical and consider the facts to discern what they are up to.

— James McGilvray, 2014

Chomsky is a prominent political dissident. (Note: Macintyre 2010; Burris 2013: "Noam Chomsky has built his entire reputation as a political dissident on his command of the facts."; McNeill 2014: "[Chomsky is] often dubbed one of the world's most important intellectuals and its leading public dissident ...") His political views have changed little since his childhood, when he was influenced by the emphasis on political activism that was ingrained in Jewish working-class tradition. He usually identifies as an anarcho-syndicalist or a libertarian socialist. He views these positions not as precise political theories but as ideals that he thinks best meet human needs: liberty, community, and freedom of association. Unlike some other socialists, such as Marxists, Chomsky believes that politics lies outside the remit of science, but he still roots his ideas about an ideal society in empirical data and empirically justified theories.

In Chomsky's view, the truth about political realities is systematically distorted or suppressed by an elite corporatocracy, which uses corporate media, advertising, and think tanks to promote its own propaganda. His work seeks to reveal such manipulations and the truth they obscure. Chomsky believes this web of falsehood can be broken by "common sense", critical thinking, and understanding the roles of self-interest and self-deception, and that intellectuals abdicate their moral responsibility to tell the truth about the world in fear of losing prestige and funding. He argues that, as such an intellectual, it is his duty to use his social privilege, resources, and training to aid popular democracy movements in their struggles.

Although he has participated in direct action demonstrations—joining protests, being arrested, organizing groups—Chomsky's primary political outlet is education, i.e., free public lessons. Chomsky is a longtime member of the Democratic Socialists of America (DSA) and a longtime member of the Industrial Workers of the World (IWW) international union, as was his father.

=== United States foreign policy ===
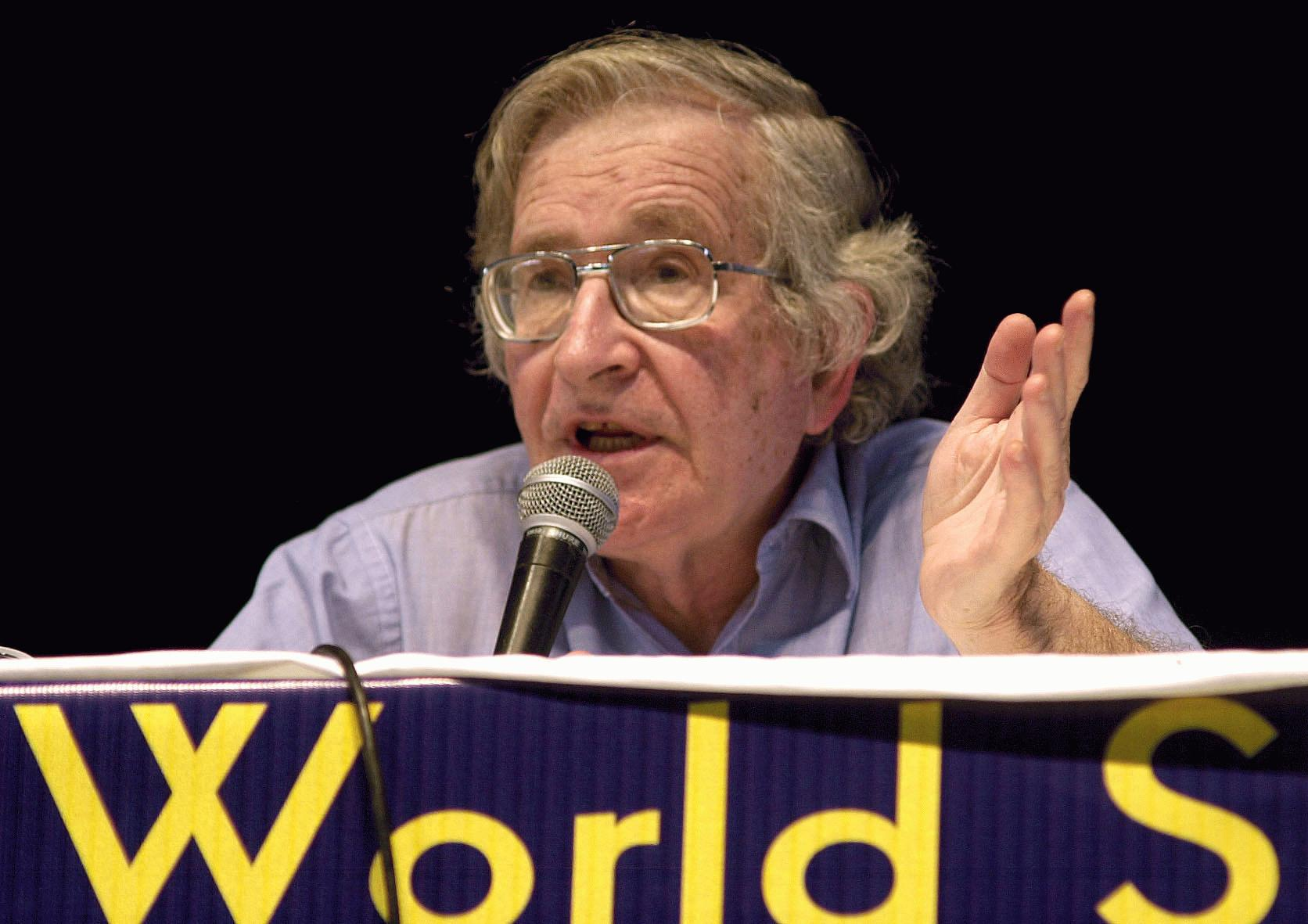
Chomsky at the 2003 World Social Forum, a convention for counter-hegemonic globalization, in Porto Alegre

Chomsky has been a prominent critic of American imperialism, but is not a pacifist, believing World War II was justified as America's last defensive war. He believes that U.S. foreign policy's basic principle is the establishment of "open societies" that are economically and politically controlled by the U.S. and where U.S.-based businesses can prosper. He argues that the U.S. seeks to suppress any movements within these countries that are not compliant with U.S. interests and to ensure that U.S.-friendly governments are placed in power. When discussing current events, he emphasizes their place within a wider historical perspective. He believes that official, sanctioned historical accounts of U.S. and British extraterritorial operations have consistently whitewashed these nations' actions in order to present them as having benevolent motives in either spreading democracy or, in older instances, spreading Christianity; by criticizing these accounts, he seeks to correct them. Prominent examples he regularly cites are the actions of the British Empire in India and Africa and U.S. actions in Vietnam, the Philippines, Latin America, and the Middle East.

Chomsky's political work has centered heavily on criticizing the actions of the United States. He has said he focuses on the U.S. because the country has militarily and economically dominated the world during his lifetime and because its liberal democratic electoral system allows the citizenry to influence government policy. His hope is that, by spreading awareness of the impact U.S. foreign policies have on the populations affected by them, he can sway the populations of the U.S. and other countries into opposing the policies. He urges people to criticize their governments' motivations, decisions, and actions, to accept responsibility for their own thoughts and actions, and to apply the same standards to others as to themselves.

Chomsky has been critical of U.S. involvement in the Israeli–Palestinian conflict, arguing that it has consistently blocked a peaceful settlement. He also criticizes the U.S.'s close ties with Saudi Arabia and involvement in Saudi Arabian-led intervention in Yemen, highlighting that Saudi Arabia has "one of the most grotesque human rights records in the world".

Chomsky called the Russian invasion of Ukraine an act of aggression similar to the US invasion of Iraq in 2003 and noted that Russia was committing major war crimes in the country. He considered support for Ukraine's self-defense legitimate and said Ukraine should be given enough military aid to defend itself, but not enough to cause "an escalation". He argued that NATO's "eastward expansion" and the prospect of Ukraine joining the alliance had provoked Russia's invasion, alleging that the United States had rejected Russian demands for Ukrainian neutrality and a negotiated compromise. According to Chomsky, the U.S. was arming Ukraine only to weaken Russia, and Ukrainian requests for heavy weaponry were untrue "Western propaganda", despite Ukraine's President Volodymyr Zelenskyy repeatedly asking for them. More than a year into the invasion, Chomsky argued that Russia was waging the war "more humanely" than the U.S. did in Iraq in 2003.

=== Capitalism and socialism ===
In his youth, Chomsky developed a dislike of capitalism and the pursuit of material wealth. At the same time, he developed a disdain for authoritarian socialism, as represented by the Marxist–Leninist policies of the Soviet Union. Rather than accepting the common view among U.S. economists that a spectrum exists between total state ownership of the economy and total private ownership, he instead suggests that a spectrum should be understood between total democratic control of the economy and total autocratic control (whether state or private). He argues that Western capitalist countries are not really democratic, because, in his view, a truly democratic society is one in which all persons have a say in public economic policy. He has stated his opposition to ruling elites, among them institutions like the IMF, World Bank, and GATT (precursor to the WTO).

Chomsky highlights that, since the 1970s, the U.S. has become increasingly economically unequal as a result of the repeal of various financial regulations and the unilateral rescinding of the Bretton Woods financial control agreement by the U.S. He characterizes the U.S. as a de facto one-party state, viewing both the Republican Party and Democratic Party as manifestations of a single "Business Party" controlled by corporate and financial interests. Chomsky highlights that, within Western capitalist liberal democracies, at least 80% of the population has no control over economic decisions, which are instead in the hands of a management class and ultimately controlled by a small, wealthy elite.

Noting the entrenchment of such an economic system, Chomsky believes that change is possible through the organized cooperation of large numbers of people who understand the problem and know how they want to reorganize the economy more equitably. Acknowledging that corporate domination of media and government stifles any significant change to this system, he sees reason for optimism in historical examples such as the social rejection of slavery as immoral, the advances in women's rights, and the forcing of government to justify invasions. He views violent revolution to overthrow a government as a last resort to be avoided if possible, citing the example of historical revolutions where the population's welfare has worsened as a result of upheaval.

Chomsky sees libertarian socialist and anarcho-syndicalist ideas as the descendants of the classical liberal ideas of the Age of Enlightenment, arguing that his ideological position revolves around "nourishing the libertarian and creative character of the human being". He envisions an anarcho-syndicalist future with direct worker control of the means of production and government by workers' councils, who would select temporary and revocable representatives to meet together at general assemblies. The point of this self-governance is to make each citizen, in Thomas Jefferson's words, "a direct participator in the government of affairs". He believes that there will be no need for political parties. By controlling their productive life, he believes that individuals can gain job satisfaction and a sense of fulfillment and purpose. He argues that unpleasant and unpopular jobs could be fully automated, specially remunerated, or communally shared.

=== Israeli–Palestinian conflict ===
Chomsky has written prolifically about the Israeli–Palestinian conflict, aiming to raise public awareness of it. A labor Zionist who later became what is today considered an anti-Zionist, Chomsky has criticized the Israeli settlements in the Israeli-occupied West Bank, which he likens to a settler colony. He has said that the 1947 United Nations Partition Plan for Palestine was a bad decision, but given the realpolitik of the situation, he has also considered a two-state solution on the condition that the nation-states exist on equal terms.

Chomsky has said that characterizing Israel's treatment of the Palestinians as apartheid, similar to the system that existed in South Africa, would be a "gift to Israel", as he has long held that "the Occupied Territories are much worse than South Africa". South Africa depended on its black population for labor, but Chomsky argues the same is not true of Israel, which in his view seeks to make the situation for Palestinians under its occupation unlivable, especially in the West Bank and the Gaza Strip, where "atrocities" take place every day. He also argues that, unlike South Africa, Israel has not sought the international community's approval, but rather relies solely on U.S. support. Chomsky has said that the Israeli-led blockade of the Gaza Strip has turned it into a "concentration camp" and expressed fears similar to Israeli intellectual Yeshayahu Leibowitz's 1990s warning that the continued occupation of the Palestinian territories could turn Israeli Jews into "Judeo-Nazis". Chomsky has said that Leibowitz's warning "was a direct reflection of the continued occupation, the humiliation of people, the degradation, and the terrorist attacks by the Israeli government". He has also called the U.S. a violent state that exports violence by supporting Israeli "atrocities" against the Palestinians and said that listening to American mainstream media, including CBS, is like listening to "Israeli propaganda agencies".

Chomsky was denied entry to the West Bank in 2010 because of his criticisms of Israel. He had been invited to deliver a lecture at Bir Zeit University and was to meet with Palestinian Prime Minister Salam Fayyad. An Israeli Foreign Ministry spokesman later said that Chomsky was denied entry by mistake.

In his 1983 book The Fateful Triangle, Chomsky criticized the Palestine Liberation Organization for its "self-destructiveness" and "suicidal character" and disapproved of its programs of "armed struggle" and "erratic violence". He also criticized the Arab governments as not "decent". Given what he has described as his very Jewish upbringing with deeply Zionist activist parents, Chomsky's views have drawn controversy and criticism. They are rooted in the kibbutzim and socialist binational cooperation. In a 2014 interview on Democracy Now!, Chomsky said that the charter of Hamas, which calls for Israel's destruction, "means practically nothing", having been created "by a small group of people under siege, under attack in 1988". He compared it to the electoral program of the Likud party, which, he said, "states explicitly that there can never be a Palestinian state west of the Jordan River. And they not only state it in their charter, that's a call for the destruction of Palestine, explicit call for it".

=== Mass media and propaganda ===
External videos
- Chomsky on propaganda and the manufacturing of consent, June 1, 2003

Chomsky's political writings have largely focused on ideology, social and political power, mass media, and state policy. One of his best-known works, Manufacturing Consent, dissects the media's role in reinforcing and acquiescing to state policies across the political spectrum while marginalizing contrary perspectives. Chomsky asserts that this version of censorship, by government-guided "free market" forces, is subtler and harder to undermine than was the equivalent propaganda system in the Soviet Union. As he argues, the mainstream press is corporate-owned and thus reflects corporate priorities and interests. Acknowledging that many American journalists are dedicated and well-meaning, he argues that the mass media's choices of topics and issues, the unquestioned premises on which that coverage rests, and the range of opinions expressed are all constrained to reinforce the state's ideology: although mass media will criticize individual politicians and political parties, it will not undermine the wider state-corporate nexus of which it is a part. As evidence, he highlights that the U.S. mass media does not employ any socialist journalists or political commentators. He also points to examples of important news stories that the U.S. mainstream media has ignored because reporting on them would reflect badly upon the country, including the murder of Black Panther Fred Hampton with possible FBI involvement, the massacres in Nicaragua perpetrated by U.S.-funded Contras, and the constant reporting on Israeli deaths without equivalent coverage of the far larger number of Palestinian deaths in that conflict. To remedy this situation, Chomsky calls for grassroots democratic control and involvement of the media.

Chomsky considers most conspiracy theories fruitless, distracting substitutes for thinking about policy formation in an institutional framework, where individual manipulation is secondary to broader social imperatives. He separates his Propaganda Model from conspiracy in that he is describing institutions following their natural imperatives rather than collusive forces with secret controls. Instead of supporting the educational system as an antidote, he believes that most education is counterproductive. Chomsky describes mass education as a system solely intended to turn farmers from independent producers into unthinking industrial employees.

=== Reactions of critics and counter-criticism: 1980s–present ===
In the 2004 book The Anti-Chomsky Reader, Peter Collier and David Horowitz accuse Chomsky of cherry-picking facts to suit his theories. Horowitz has also criticized Chomsky's anti-Americanism:

For 40 years Noam Chomsky has turned out book after book, pamphlet after pamphlet and speech after speech with one message, and one message alone: America is the Great Satan; it is the fount of evil in the world. In Chomsky's demented universe, America is responsible not only for its own bad deeds, but for the bad deeds of others, including those of the terrorists who struck the World Trade Center and the Pentagon. In this attitude he is the medium for all those who now search the ruins of Manhattan not for the victims and the American dead, but for the "root causes" of the catastrophe that befell them.

For the conservative public policy think tank the Hoover Institution, Peter Schweizer wrote in January 2006, "Chomsky favors the estate tax and massive income redistribution—just not the redistribution of his income." Schweizer criticized Chomsky for setting up an estate plan and protecting his own intellectual property as it relates to his published works, as well as the high speaking fees that Chomsky received on a regular basis, around $9,000–$12,000 per talk at that time.

Mark Bauerlein has accused Chomsky of credulity about socialist or communist regimes while examining capitalist regimes with greater scrutiny or criticism:

Chomsky's analysis of U.S. actions plunged deep into dark U.S. machinations, but when traveling among the Communists he rested content with appearances. The countryside outside Hanoi, he reported in The New York Review of Books, displayed "a high degree of democratic participation at the village and regional levels." But how could he tell? Chomsky did not speak Vietnamese, and so he depended on government translators, tour guides, and handlers for information. In [Communist] Vietnamese hands, the clear-eyed skepticism turned into willing credulousness.

According to Nikolas Kozloff, writing for Al Jazeera in September 2012, Chomsky "has drawn the world's attention to the various misdeeds of the US and its proxies around the world, and for that he deserves credit. Yet, in seeking to avoid controversy at all costs Chomsky has turned into something of an ideologue. Scour the Chomsky web site and you won't find significant discussion of Belarus or Latin America's flirtation with outside authoritarian leaders, for that matter."

Political activist George Monbiot has argued that "Part of the problem is that a kind of cult has developed around Noam Chomsky and John Pilger, which cannot believe they could ever be wrong, and produces ever more elaborate conspiracy theories to justify their mistakes."

Defenders of Chomsky have countered that he has been censored or left out of public debate. Claims of this nature date to the Reagan era. Writing for The Washington Post in February 1988, Saul Landau wrote, "It is unhealthy that Chomsky's insights are excluded from the policy debate. His relentless prosecutorial prose, with a hint of Talmudic whine and the rationalist anarchism of Tom Paine, may reflect a justified frustration."

== Philosophy ==
Chomsky has also been active in a number of philosophical fields, including philosophy of mind, philosophy of language, and philosophy of science. In these fields he is credited with ushering in the "cognitive revolution", a significant paradigm shift that rejected logical positivism, the prevailing philosophical methodology of the time, and reframed how philosophers think about language and the mind. Chomsky views the cognitive revolution as rooted in 17th-century rationalist ideals. His position—the idea that the mind contains inherent structures to understand language, perception, and thought—has more in common with rationalism than behaviorism. He named one of his key works Cartesian Linguistics: A Chapter in the History of Rationalist Thought (1966). This sparked criticism from historians and philosophers who disagreed with Chomsky's interpretations of classical sources and use of philosophical terminology. (Note: Hamans & Seuren 2010, p. 377: "Having achieved a unique position of supremacy in the theory of syntax and having exploited that position far beyond the narrow circles of professional syntacticians, he felt the need to shore up his theory with the authority of history. It is shown that this attempt, resulting mainly in his Cartesian Linguistics of 1966, was widely, and rightly, judged to be a radical failure") In the philosophy of language, Chomsky is particularly known for his criticisms of the notion of reference and meaning in human language and his perspective on the nature and function of mental representations.

Chomsky's 1971 debate on human nature with the French philosopher Michel Foucault was a symbolic clash of the analytic and continental philosophy traditions, represented by Chomsky and Foucault, respectively. It showed what appeared to be irreconcilable differences between two moral and intellectual figures of the 20th century. Foucault held that any definition of human nature is connected to our present-day conceptions of ourselves; Chomsky held that human nature contained universals such as a common standard of moral justice as deduced through reason. Chomsky criticized postmodernism and French philosophy generally, arguing that the obscure language of postmodern, leftist philosophers gives little aid to the working classes. He has also debated analytic philosophers, including Tyler Burge, Donald Davidson, Michael Dummett, Saul Kripke, Thomas Nagel, Hilary Putnam, Willard Van Orman Quine, and John Searle.

Chomsky's contributions span intellectual and world history, including the history of philosophy. Irony is a recurring characteristic of his writing, such as rhetorically implying that his readers already know something to be true, which engages the reader more actively in assessing the veracity of his claims.

== Personal life ==
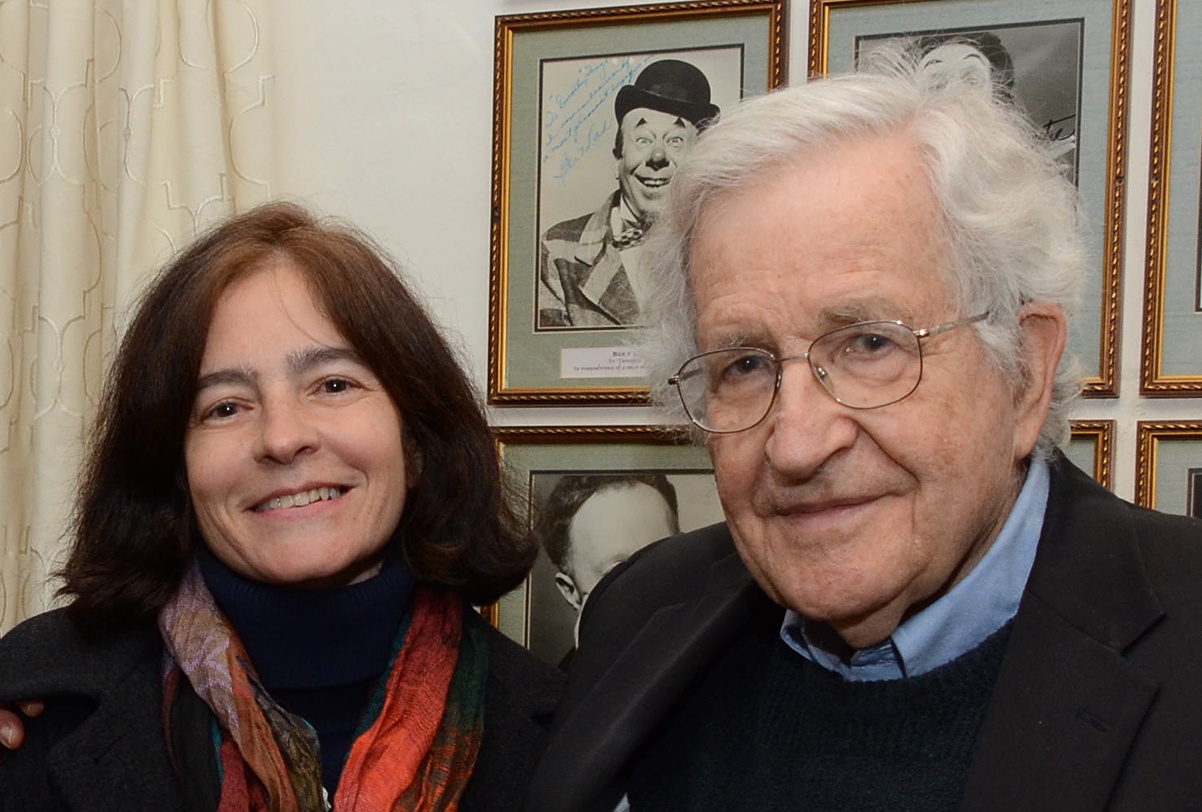
Valeria Wasserman and Chomsky in 2014

Chomsky endeavors to separate his family life, linguistic scholarship, and political activism from each other. An intensely private person, he is uninterested in appearances and the fame his work has brought him. McGilvray suggests that Chomsky is not motivated by a desire for fame but impelled to tell what he perceives as the truth and by a desire to aid others in doing so. Chomsky acknowledges that his income affords him a privileged life compared to the majority of the world's population. Nevertheless, he characterizes himself as a "worker", albeit one who uses his intellect as his employable skill. Sperlich (2006) reported a breakfast routine where Chomsky reads four or five different daily newspapers. In the U.S., he subscribes to The Boston Globe, The New York Times, The Wall Street Journal, Financial Times, and The Christian Science Monitor. Chomsky is not religious but has expressed approval of forms of religion such as liberation theology.

Chomsky is known to use charged language ("corrupt", "fascist", "fraudulent") when describing established political and academic figures, which can polarize his audience but is in keeping with his belief that much scholarship is self-serving. His colleague Steven Pinker has said that Chomsky "portrays people who disagree with him as stupid or evil, using withering scorn in his rhetoric", and that this contributes to the extreme reactions he receives. Chomsky avoids academic conferences, including left-oriented ones such as the Socialist Scholars Conference, preferring to speak to activist groups or hold university seminars for mass audiences. His approach to academic freedom has led him to support MIT academics whose actions he deplores. In 1969, when he heard that Walt Rostow, a major architect of the Vietnam War, wanted to return to work at MIT, Chomsky threatened "to protest publicly" if Rostow were denied a position there. In 1989, when Pentagon adviser John Deutch applied to be president of MIT, Chomsky supported his candidacy. Later, when Deutch became head of the CIA, The New York Times quoted Chomsky as saying, "He has more honesty and integrity than anyone I've ever met. ... If somebody's got to be running the CIA, I'm glad it's him."

Chomsky was married to Carol Doris (née Schatz) from 1949 until her death in 2008. They had three children together: Aviva (b. 1957), Diane (b. 1960), and Harry (b. 1967). In 2014, Chomsky married Valeria Wasserman, a translator for the Institute for Advanced Studies at the University of São Paulo. They have owned a home in Wasserman's native country, Brazil, since 2015. Judith Chomsky and Marvin J. Chomsky are Noam's cousins.

In 2023, Chomsky suffered a massive stroke and was flown to a hospital in São Paulo, Brazil, to recuperate. He can no longer walk or communicate, making his return to public life improbable. He was discharged in June 2024 to continue his recovery at home. The same month, Chomsky trended on social media amid false reports of his death; periodicals retracted premature obituaries. As of November 2025, Chomsky was reportedly still convalescing in Brazil.

=== Friendship with Jeffrey Epstein ===
Emails related to the activities of convicted child sex offender Jeffrey Epstein released by the House Oversight Committee in November 2025 revealed that Chomsky befriended him in 2015, after Epstein's 2008 conviction, advised him on how to deal with media coverage of sex trafficking allegations, and remained in touch with him through 2019. In a letter, he wrote that he considered Epstein a "highly valued friend and regular source of intellectual exchange and stimulation". In December 2025, Congress released a photo of Chomsky with Steve Bannon from Epstein's estate and another showing him flying with Epstein in the latter's private plane. Before the files' release, Chomsky had said he received around $270,000 from an account connected to Epstein while sorting through common funds after his wife Carol's death. In 2016, Epstein invited Chomsky and his wife, Valeria, to meet in either New York or the Caribbean. Chomsky replied: "Valeria's always keen on New York. I'm really fantasizing about the Caribbean island." In 2019, Epstein referenced advice he said Chomsky had given him on handling media scrutiny after his 2008 plea deal: "The best way to proceed is to ignore it ... That's particularly true now with the hysteria that has developed about abuse of women, which has reached the point that even questioning a charge is a crime worse than murder." Chomsky consulted Epstein for guidance on drafting an email to his financial advisor about a $187,000 payment that had already been disbursed. He also contacted Bannon using an email address Epstein provided.

In 2023, Chomsky told The Wall Street Journal of his relationship with Epstein: "First response is that it is none of your business. Or anyone's. Second is that I knew him and we met occasionally."

In 2026, Wasserman wrote that Chomsky's relationship with Epstein was a "grave mistake" and apologized on her husband's behalf, writing, "It was deeply disturbing for both of us to realize we had engaged with someone who presented as a helpful friend but led a hidden life of criminal, inhumane, and perverted acts." The couple's two financial transactions with Epstein were related to retirement income, according to reporting in both The Guardian and The Jerusalem Post.

== Reception and influence ==
[Chomsky's] voice is heard in academia beyond linguistics and philosophy: from computer science to neuroscience, from anthropology to education, mathematics and literary criticism. If we include Chomsky's political activism then the boundaries become quite blurred, and it comes as no surprise that Chomsky is increasingly seen as enemy number one by those who inhabit that wide sphere of reactionary discourse and action.

— Sperlich, 2006

Chomsky has been a defining Western intellectual figure, central to the field of linguistics and definitive in cognitive science, computer science, philosophy, and psychology. In addition to being known as one of the most important intellectuals of his time, (Note: McNeill 2014: "[Chomsky is] often dubbed one of the world's most important intellectuals ..."; Campbell 2005: "Noam Chomsky, the linguistics professor who has become one of the most outspoken critics of US foreign policy, has won a poll that names him as the world's top public intellectual."; Robinson 1979: "Judged in terms of the power, range, novelty and influence of his thought, Noam Chomsky is arguably the most important intellectual alive today."; Flint 1995: "The man once called the most important intellectual alive keeps his office in ... the campus of the Massachusetts Institute of Technology.") Chomsky has a dual legacy as a leader and luminary in both linguistics and the realm of political dissent. Despite his academic success, his political viewpoints and activism have resulted in his being distrusted by mainstream media, and he is regarded as being "on the outer margin of acceptability". Chomsky's public image and social reputation often color his work's public reception.

=== In academia ===
McGilvray observes that Chomsky inaugurated the "cognitive revolution" in linguistics, and that he is largely responsible for establishing the field as a formal, natural science, moving it away from the procedural form of structural linguistics dominant during the mid-20th century. As such, some have called Chomsky "the father of modern linguistics". Linguist John Lyons further remarked that within a few decades of publication, Chomskyan linguistics had become "the most dynamic and influential" school of thought in the field. By the 1970s his work had also come to exert a considerable influence on philosophy, and a Minnesota State University Moorhead poll ranked Syntactic Structures as the single most important work in cognitive science. In addition, his work in automata theory and the Chomsky hierarchy have become well known in computer science, and he is much cited in computational linguistics.

Chomsky's criticisms of behaviorism contributed substantially to the decline of behaviorist psychology; in addition, he is generally regarded as one of the primary founders of the field of cognitive science. Some arguments in evolutionary psychology are derived from his research results; Nim Chimpsky, a chimpanzee who was the subject of a study in animal language acquisition at Columbia University, was named after Chomsky in reference to his view of language acquisition as a uniquely human ability.

ACM Turing Award winner Donald Knuth credited Chomsky's work with helping him combine his interests in mathematics, linguistics, and computer science. IBM computer scientist John Backus, another Turing Award winner, used some of Chomsky's concepts to help him develop FORTRAN, the first widely used high-level computer programming language. Chomsky's theory of generative grammar has also influenced work in music theory and analysis, such as Fred Lerdahl's and Ray Jackendoff's generative theory of tonal music.

Chomsky is among the most cited authors living or dead. (Note: Knight 2016, p. 2: "In 1992, the Arts and Humanities Citation Index ranked him as the most cited person alive (the Index's top ten being Marx, Lenin, Shakespeare, Aristotle, the Bible, Plato, Freud, Chomsky, Hegel and Cicero)."; Babe 2015, p. xvii: "[Chomsky] was the most cited living scholar between 1980 and 1992 (according to the Arts and Humanities Citation Index).") He was cited within the Arts and Humanities Citation Index more often than any other living scholar from 1980 to 1992. Chomsky was also extensively cited in the Social Sciences Citation Index and Science Citation Index during the same period. The librarian who conducted the research said that the statistics show that "he is very widely read across disciplines and that his work is used by researchers across disciplines ... it seems that you can't write a paper without citing Noam Chomsky." As a result of his influence, there are dueling camps of Chomskyan and non-Chomskyan linguistics. Their disputes are often acrimonious. Additionally, according to journalist Maya Jaggi, Chomsky is among the most quoted sources in the humanities, ranking alongside Karl Marx, William Shakespeare and the Bible.

=== In politics ===
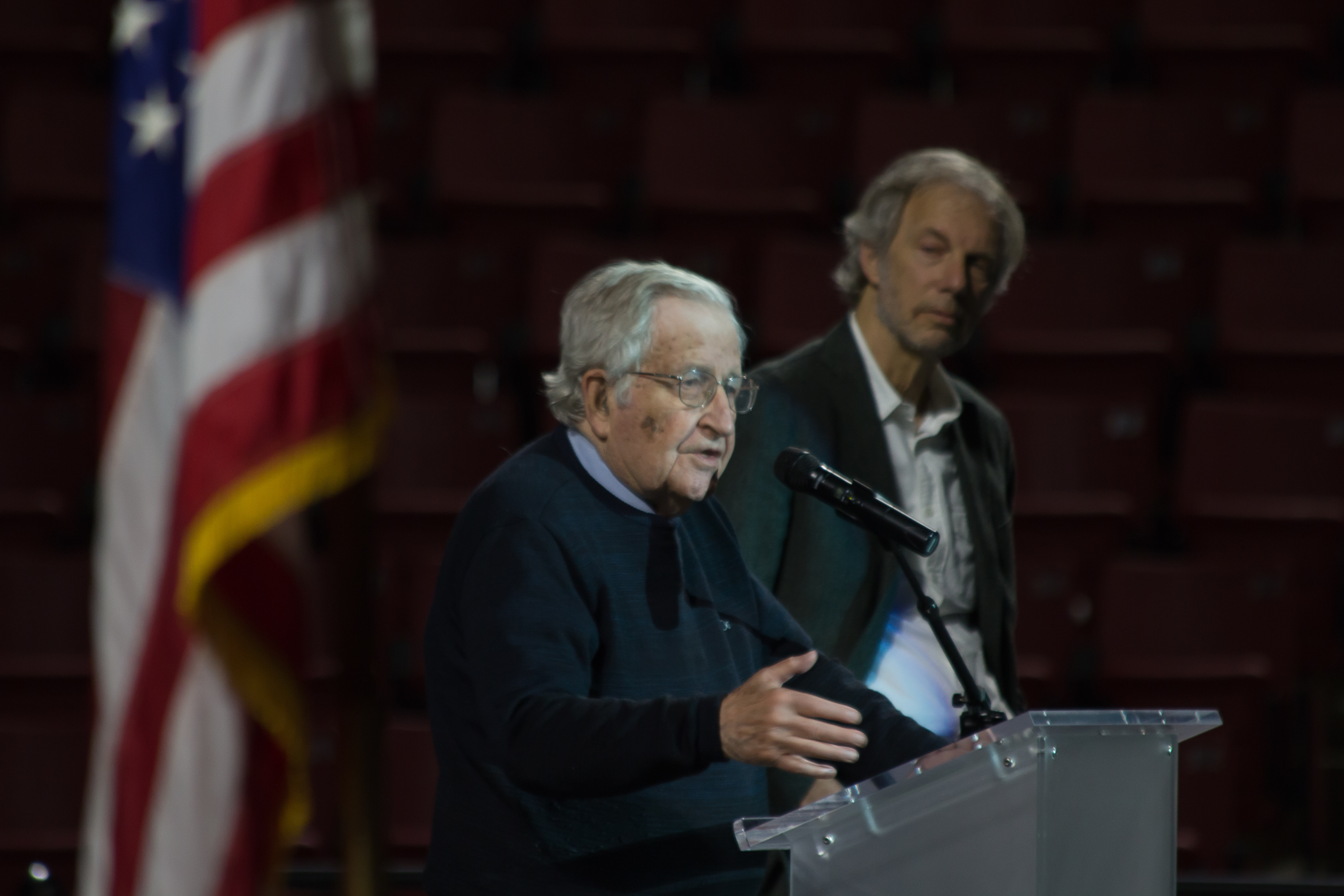
Chomsky cautions against ignoring the threats of climate change and nuclear war in the wake of Donald Trump's election, in a 2017 speech.

Chomsky's status as the "most-quoted living author" is credited to his political writings, which vastly outnumber his writings on linguistics. Chomsky biographer Wolfgang B. Sperlich characterizes him as "one of the most notable contemporary champions of the people"; journalist John Pilger has described him as a "genuine people's hero; an inspiration for struggles all over the world for that basic decency known as freedom. To a lot of people in the margins—activists and movements—he's unfailingly supportive." Arundhati Roy has called him "one of the greatest, most radical public thinkers of our time", and Edward Said thought him "one of the most significant challengers of unjust power and delusions". Fred Halliday has said that by the start of the 21st century Chomsky had become a "guru" for the world's anti-capitalist and anti-imperialist movements. The propaganda model of media criticism that he and Herman developed has been widely accepted in radical media critiques and adopted to some level in mainstream criticism of the media, also exerting a significant influence on the growth of alternative media, including radio, publishers, and the Internet, which in turn have helped to disseminate his work.

Despite this broad influence, university departments devoted to history and political science rarely include Chomsky's work on their undergraduate syllabi. Critics have argued that despite publishing widely on social and political issues, Chomsky has no formal expertise in these areas; he has responded that such issues are not as complex as many social scientists claim and that almost everyone is able to comprehend them regardless of whether they have been academically trained to do so. Some have responded to these criticisms by questioning the critics' motives and their understanding of Chomsky's ideas. Sperlich, for instance, says that Chomsky has been vilified by corporate interests, particularly in the mainstream press. Likewise, according to McGilvray, many of Chomsky's critics "do not bother quoting his work or quote out of context, distort, and create straw men that cannot be supported by Chomsky's text".

Chomsky drew criticism for not calling the Bosnian War's Srebrenica massacre a "genocide". While he did not deny the fact of the massacre, which he called "a horror story and major crime", he felt the massacre did not meet the definition of genocide. Critics have accused Chomsky of denying the Bosnian genocide.

Chomsky's far-reaching criticisms of U.S. foreign policy and the legitimacy of U.S. power have raised controversy. A document obtained pursuant to a Freedom of Information Act (FOIA) request from the U.S. government revealed that the Central Intelligence Agency (CIA) monitored his activities and for years denied doing so. The CIA also destroyed its files on Chomsky at some point, possibly in violation of federal law. He has often received undercover police protection at MIT and when speaking on the Middle East but has refused uniformed police protection. German news magazine Der Spiegel described Chomsky as "the Ayatollah of anti-American hatred", while American conservative commentator David Horowitz called him "the most devious, the most dishonest and ... the most treacherous intellect in America", whose work is infused with "anti-American dementia" and evidences his "pathological hatred of his own country".

Chomsky's criticism of Israel has led to his being called a traitor to the Jewish people and an antisemite. Criticizing Chomsky's defense of the right of individuals to engage in Holocaust denial on the grounds that freedom of speech must be extended to all viewpoints, Werner Cohn called Chomsky "the most important patron" of the neo-Nazi movement. The Anti-Defamation League (ADL) called him a Holocaust denier, describing him as a "dupe of intellectual pride so overweening that he is incapable of making distinctions between totalitarian and democratic societies, between oppressors and victims". In turn, Chomsky has claimed that the ADL is dominated by "Stalinist types" who oppose democracy in Israel. The lawyer Alan Dershowitz has called Chomsky a "false prophet of the left"; Chomsky called Dershowitz "a complete liar" who is on "a crazed jihad, dedicating much of his life to trying to destroy my reputation". In early 2016, President Recep Tayyip Erdoğan of Turkey publicly rebuked Chomsky after he signed an open letter condemning Erdoğan for his anti-Kurdish repression and double standards on terrorism. Chomsky accused Erdoğan of hypocrisy, noting that Erdoğan supports al-Qaeda's Syrian affiliate, the al-Nusra Front.

=== Academic achievements, awards, and honors ===
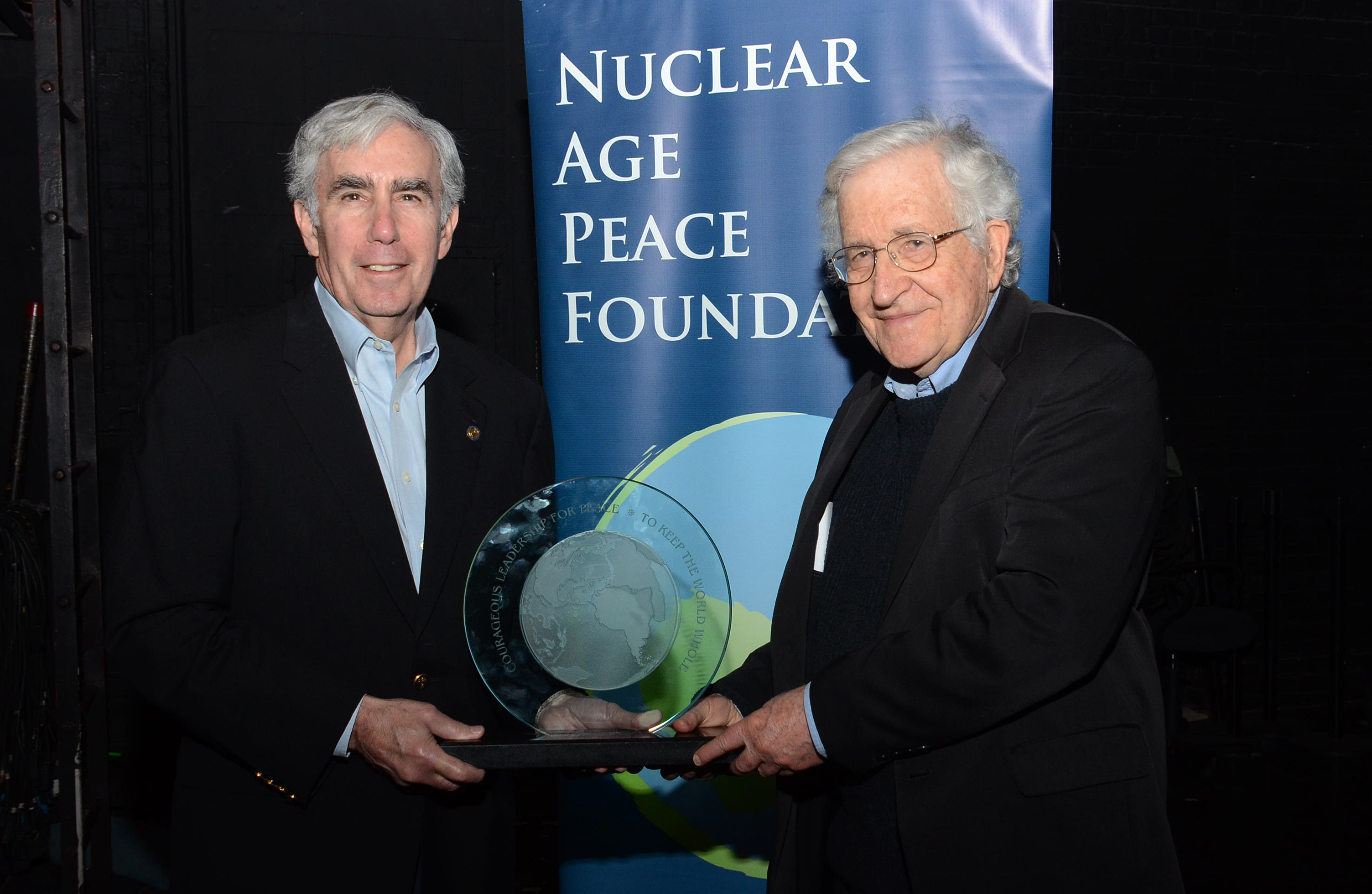
Chomsky receiving an award from the president of the Nuclear Age Peace Foundation, David Krieger (2014)

In 1970, the London Times named Chomsky one of the "makers of the twentieth century". He was voted the world's leading public intellectual in The 2005 Global Intellectuals Poll jointly conducted by American magazine Foreign Policy and British magazine Prospect. New Statesman readers listed Chomsky among the world's foremost heroes in 2006. In 2011, the US Peace Memorial Foundation awarded The US Peace Prize to Chomsky, "whose antiwar activities for five decades both educate and inspire".

In the United States he is a Member of the National Academy of Sciences, the American Academy of Arts and Sciences, the Linguistic Society of America, the American Association for the Advancement of Science, the American Philosophical Association, and the American Philosophical Society. Abroad he is a corresponding fellow of the British Academy, an honorary member of the British Psychological Society, a member of the Deutsche Akademie der Naturforscher Leopoldina, and a foreign member of the Department of Social Sciences of the Serbian Academy of Sciences and Arts. He received a 1971 Guggenheim Fellowship, the 1984 American Psychological Association Award for Distinguished Contributions to Psychology, the 1988 Kyoto Prize in Basic Sciences, the 1996 Helmholtz Medal, the 1999 Benjamin Franklin Medal in Computer and Cognitive Science, the 2010 Erich Fromm Prize, and the British Academy's 2014 Neil and Saras Smith Medal for Linguistics. He is also a two-time winner of the NCTE George Orwell Award for Distinguished Contribution to Honesty and Clarity in Public Language (1987 and 1989). He has also received the Rabindranath Tagore Centenary Award from The Asiatic Society.

Chomsky received the 2004 Carl-von-Ossietzky Prize from the city of Oldenburg, Germany, to acknowledge his body of work as a political analyst and media critic. He received an honorary fellowship in 2005 from the Literary and Historical Society of University College Dublin. He received the 2008 President's Medal from the Literary and Debating Society of the National University of Ireland, Galway. Since 2009, he has been an honorary member of International Association of Professional Translators and Interpreters (IAPTI). He received the University of Wisconsin's A.E. Havens Center's Award for Lifetime Contribution to Critical Scholarship and was inducted into IEEE Intelligent Systems' AI's Hall of Fame for "significant contributions to the field of AI and intelligent systems". Chomsky has an Erdős number of four.

In 2011, the US Peace Memorial Foundation awarded Chomsky the US Peace Prize for anti-war activities over five decades. For his work in human rights, peace, and social criticism, he received the 2011 Sydney Peace Prize, the Sretenje Order in 2015, the 2017 Seán MacBride Peace Prize and the Dorothy Eldridge Peacemaker Award.

Chomsky has received honorary doctorates from institutions including the University of London and the University of Chicago (1967), Loyola University Chicago and Swarthmore College (1970), Bard College (1971), Delhi University (1972), the University of Massachusetts (1973), and the International School for Advanced Studies (2012). Public lectures given by Chomsky include the 1969 John Locke Lectures, 1975 Whidden Lectures, 1977 Huizinga Lecture, and 1988 Massey Lectures.

Various tributes to Chomsky have been dedicated over the years. He is the eponym for a bee species, a frog species, an asteroid, and a building complex at the Indian university Jamia Millia Islamia. Actor Viggo Mortensen and avant-garde guitarist Buckethead dedicated their 2003 album Pandemoniumfromamerica to Chomsky.

== Selected bibliography ==
Linguistics

- Syntactic Structures (1957)
- Current Issues in Linguistic Theory (1964)
- Aspects of the Theory of Syntax (1965)
- Cartesian Linguistics (1966)
- Language and Mind (1968)
- The Sound Pattern of English with Morris Halle (1968)
- Reflections on Language (1975)
- Lectures on Government and Binding (1981)
- The Minimalist Program (1995)

Politics

- The Responsibility of Intellectuals (1967)
- American Power and the New Mandarins (1969)
- For Reasons of State (1973)
- Counter-Revolutionary Violence: Bloodbaths in Fact & Propaganda with Edward S. Herman (1973)
- The Political Economy of Human Rights (1979)
- Towards a New Cold War (1982)
- The Fateful Triangle (1983)
- Pirates and Emperors (1986)
- Manufacturing Consent (1988)
- Necessary Illusions (1989)
- Deterring Democracy (1991)
- Letters from Lexington (1993)
- The Prosperous Few and the Restless Many (1993)
- World Orders Old and New (1994)
- Objectivity and Liberal Scholarship (1997)
- Profit over People (1999)
- 9-11 (2001)
- Understanding Power (2002)
- Middle East Illusions (2003)
- Hegemony or Survival (2003)
- Getting Haiti Right This Time (2004)
- Imperial Ambitions (2005)
- Failed States: The Abuse of Power and the Assault on Democracy (2006)
- Interventions (2007)
- Gaza in Crisis (2010)
- How the World Works (2011)
- Making the Future (2012)
- Occupy (2012)
- Requiem for the American Dream (2017)
- The Withdrawal (2022)
- The Myth of American Idealism (2024)

== See also ==
- Anarchism in the United States
- American philosophy
- List of linguists
- List of peace activists
- List of pioneers in computer science
- Theoretical linguistics

== Sources ==
- Adams, Tim (November 30, 2003). "Noam Chomsky: Thorn in America's side". The Guardian. Archived from the original on May 16, 2008.
- Aeschimann, Eric (May 31, 2010). "Chomsky s'est exposé, il est donc une cible désignée". Libération (in French). Archived from the original on September 26, 2012. "Chomsky a été violemment blessé du fait qu'une partie des intellectuels français aient pu le croire en accord avec Faurisson, en contradiction avec tous ses engagements et toute sa vie."
- Albert, Michael (2006). Remembering Tomorrow: From the politics of opposition to what we are for. Seven Stories Press. pp. 97–99. ISBN 978-158322742-8.
- Allott, Nick; Knight, Chris; Smith, Neil, eds. (2019). The Responsibility of Intellectuals - Reflections by Noam Chomsky and Others after 50 years (PDF). London: UCL Press. ISBN 978-1787355514. Archived (PDF) from the original on September 5, 2019.
- Antony, Louise M.; Hornstein, Norbert, eds. (2003). Chomsky and His Critics. Malden, MA: Blackwell Publishing. p. 295. ISBN 978-0-631-20021-5 – via Internet Archive.
- "Archbishop Desmond Tutu to speak to Litndeb". January 9, 2009. Archived from the original on May 11, 2011.
- "Author, activist Noam Chomsky to receive award". University of Wisconsin–Madison. March 29, 2010. Archived from the original on December 9, 2015.
- Babe, Robert E. (2015). Wilbur Schramm and Noam Chomsky Meet Harold Innis: Media, Power, and Democracy. Lexington Books. ISBN 978-1-4985-0682-3.
- Baroni, M.; Callegari, L., eds. (1982). Musical grammars and computer analysis. Firenze: Leo S. Olschki Editore. pp. 201–218. ISBN 978-882223229-8.
- Barsky, Robert F. (1997). Noam Chomsky: A Life of Dissent. Cambridge, MA: MIT Press. ISBN 978-0-262-02418-1.
- Barsky, Robert F. (2007). The Chomsky Effect: A Radical Works Beyond the Ivory Tower. MIT Press. p. 107. ISBN 978-026202624-6 – via Internet Archive.
- Bauerlein, Mark (April 1, 2005). "Deconstructing Chomsky". Reason.com. Archived from the original on April 27, 2023.
- Baughman, Judith S.; Bondi, Victor; Layman, Richard; McConnell, Tandy; Tompkins, Vincent, eds. (2006). "Noam Chomsky". American Decades. Detroit, MI: Gale. Archived from the original on February 14, 2022.
- Birnbaum, Jean (June 3, 2010). "Chomsky à Paris: chronique d'un malentendu". Le Monde des Livres. Le Monde (in French). Archived from the original on April 27, 2021. "Le pays de Descartes ignore largement ce rationaliste, la patrie des Lumières se dérobe à ce militant de l'émancipation. Il le sait, et c'est pourquoi il n'y avait pas mis les pieds depuis un quart de siècle."
- Boden, Margaret A. (2006). Mind As Machine: a History of Cognitive Science. Oxford University Press. ISBN 978-019924144-6 – via Internet Archive.
- de Bot, Kees (2015). A History of Applied Linguistics: From 1980 to the Present. Routledge. ISBN 978-113882065-4.
- Braun, Stuart (2018). "Dissident intellectual Noam Chomsky at 90". Deutsche Welle. Archived from the original on October 5, 2021.
- "British Academy announces 2014 prize and medal winners". British Academy. July 24, 2014. Archived from the original on October 19, 2017.
- Bronner, Ethan (May 17, 2010). "Israel Roiled After Chomsky Barred From West Bank". The New York Times. ISSN 0362-4331. Archived from the original on August 14, 2021.
- Burris, Greg (August 11, 2013). "What the Chomsky-Žižek debate tells us about Snowden's NSA revelations". The Guardian. Archived from the original on October 16, 2021.
- Butterfield, Andrew; Ngondi, Gerard Ekembe; Kerr, Anne, eds. (2016). "Chomsky hierarchy". A Dictionary of Computer Science. Oxford University Press. ISBN 978-0-19-968897-5. Archived from the original on April 28, 2021.
- Campbell, Duncan (October 18, 2005). "Chomsky is voted world's top public intellectual". The Guardian. ISSN 0261-3077. Archived from the original on June 15, 2013.
- "Chomsky". inventio-musikverlag.de. Archived from the original on August 5, 2016.
- "Chomsky Amid the Philosophers". University of East Anglia. Archived from the original on November 13, 2013.
- Chomsky, Noam (2022). "Interview with Noam Chomsky on the beginnings of generative grammar". hiphilangsci.net.
- Chomsky, Noam. "The 'Chomskyan Era' (excerpted from The Architecture of Language)". Chomsky.info. Archived from the original on September 23, 2015.
- Chomsky, Noam (1991). Kasher, Asa (ed.). Linguistics and Cognitive Science: Problems and Mysteries. Oxford: Blackwell. p. 50.
- Chomsky, Noam (1996). Class Warfare: Interviews with David Barsamian. Pluto Press. pp. 135–136. ISBN 978-074531137-1.
- Chomsky, Noam (May 18, 2016). "Is the US Ready for Socialism? An Interview With Noam Chomsky". Truthout. Interviewed by C.J. Polychroniou. Archived from the original on August 17, 2021. also available, in part, on chomsky.info Archived March 8, 2021, at the Wayback Machine.
- "Chomsky: Saudi Arabia is the "Center of Radical Islamic Extremism" Now Spreading Among Sunni Muslims". Democracy Now!. May 17, 2016. Archived from the original on April 15, 2021.
- Christiansen, Morten H.; Chater, Nick (October 2010). "Language as shaped by the brain". Behavioral and Brain Sciences. 31 (5): 489–509. doi:10.1017/S0140525X08004998. ISSN 1469-1825. PMID 18826669.
- Cipriani, Enrico (2016). "Some reflections on Chomsky's notion of reference". Linguistics Beyond and within. 2: 44–60. doi:10.31743/lingbaw.5637. hdl:20.500.12153/7148.
- Cohn, Werner (1995) [First published 1985]. Partners in Hate: Noam Chomsky and the Holocaust Deniers. Cambridge, MA: Avukah Press. ISBN 978-0-9645897-0-4.
- Cowley, Jason (May 22, 2006). "New Statesman – Heroes of our time – the top 50". New Statesman. Archived from the original on December 27, 2006.
- Davis, Martin; Weyuker, Elaine J.; Sigal, Ron (1994). Computability, complexity, and languages: fundamentals of theoretical computer science (2nd ed.). Boston: Academic Press, Harcourt, Brace. p. 327. ISBN 978-0-12-206382-4 – via Internet Archive.
- "Denied Entry: Israel Blocks Noam Chomsky from Entering West Bank to Deliver Speech". Democracy Now!. May 17, 2010. Archived from the original on April 27, 2021.
- Dovey, Dana (December 7, 2015). "Noam Chomsky's Theory Of Universal Grammar Is Right; It's Hardwired Into Our Brains". Medical Daily. Archived from the original on November 12, 2021.
- "The Erdös Number Project". Oakland University. November 21, 2017. Archived from the original on October 22, 2018.
- "Erich-Fromm-Preis: Noam Chomsky in Stuttgart geehrt". Stuttgarter Zeitung (in German). Deutsche Presse-Agentur. March 23, 2010. Archived from the original on August 16, 2021.
- Evans, Nicholas; Levinson, Stephen C. (October 2009). "The myth of language universals: Language diversity and its importance for cognitive science". Behavioral and Brain Sciences. 32 (5): 429–448. doi:10.1017/S0140525X0999094X. hdl:11858/00-001M-0000-0012-C29E-4. ISSN 1469-1825. PMID 19857320.
- Fernald, Anne; Marchman, Virginia A. (2006). "Language learning in infancy". In Traxler, Matthew; Gernsbacher, Morton Ann (eds.). Handbook of Psycholinguistics. Academic Press. pp. 1027–1071. ISBN 978-008046641-5.
- Flint, Anthony (November 19, 1995). "Divided Legacy". The Boston Globe. p. 25. ISSN 0743-1791. ProQuest 290754647.
- Fox, Margalit (December 5, 1998). "A Changed Noam Chomsky Simplifies". The New York Times. ISSN 0362-4331. Archived from the original on April 27, 2021.
- Friesen, Norm (2017). The Textbook and the Lecture: Education in the Age of New Media. Johns Hopkins University Press. ISBN 978-1421424347.
- Fulton, Scott M. III (March 20, 2007). "John W. Backus (1924–2007)". BetaNews. Archived from the original on April 22, 2014.
- Gendzier, Irene (2017). "15: Noam Chomsky and the Question of Palestine/Israel: Bearing Witness". In McGilvray, James (ed.). The Cambridge Companion to Chomsky (2nd ed.). Cambridge University Press. pp. 314–329. ISBN 978-1316738757.
- Gold, Daniel M. (January 28, 2016). "Review: Noam Chomsky Focuses on Financial Inequality in 'Requiem for the American Dream'". The New York Times. ISSN 0362-4331. Archived from the original on August 17, 2021.
- Gould, S. J. (1981). Official Transcript for Gould's deposition in McLean v. Arkansas. Archived from the original on February 18, 2015.
- Graham, George (2019). "Behaviorism". In Zalta, Edward N. (ed.). Stanford Encyclopedia of Philosophy (Spring 2019 ed.). Metaphysics Research Lab, Stanford University. Archived from the original on December 19, 2021.
- Greif, Mark (2015). The Age of the Crisis of Man: Thought and Fiction in America, 1933–1973. Princeton, N.J.: Princeton University Press. ISBN 978-0-691-14639-3.
- Hamans, Camiel; Seuren, Pieter A. M. (2010). "Chomsky in search of a pedigree". In Kibbee, Douglas A. (ed.). Chomskyan (R)evolutions. John Benjamins. pp. 377–394. ISBN 978-9027211699. Archived from the original on November 28, 2021.
- Harbord, Shaun (1994). "Extracts form 'An historian's appraisal of the political writings of Noam Chomsky'". In Otero, Carlos Peregrín (ed.). Noam Chomsky: Critical Assessments, Volumes 2–3. Taylor & Francis. p. 487. ISBN 978-0-415-10694-8. Archived from the original on August 16, 2021.
- Harlow, S. J. (2010). "Transformational Grammar: Evolution". In Barber, Alex; Stainton, Robert J. (eds.). Concise Encyclopedia of Philosophy of Language and Linguistics. Elsevier. pp. 752–770. ISBN 978-0-08-096501-7 – via Internet Archive.
- Harris, R. Allen (2010). "Chomsky's other Revolution". In Kibbee, Douglas A. (ed.). Chomskyan (R)evolutions. Amsterdam and Philadelphia, PA: John Benjamins Publishing Company. pp. 237–265. ISBN 978-90-272-1169-9 – via Internet Archive.
- Harris, Randy Allen (2021). The Linguistics Wars: Chomsky, Lakoff, and the Battle over Deep Structure (2nd ed.). Oxford University Press. ISBN 978-0199740338. Archived from the original on February 14, 2022.
- Harwood, Lori (November 21, 2016). "Noam Chomsky to Teach Politics Course In Spring". UA News. Archived from the original on June 13, 2020.
- Hjelmslev, Louis (1969) [First published 1943]. Prolegomena to a Theory of Language. University of Wisconsin Press. ISBN 0299024709.
- "Honorary Members of IAPTI". International Association of Professional Translators and Interpreters. Archived from the original on January 18, 2017.
- "Honors & Awards". Soundings. Fall 2002. Archived from the original on March 8, 2021.
- Hornstein, Norbert (2003). "Minimalist Program". International Encyclopedia of Linguistics. Oxford University Press. ISBN 978-0-19-513977-8. Archived from the original on April 28, 2021.
- Horowitz, David (September 26, 2001). "The Sick Mind of Noam Chomsky". Salon. Archived from the original on May 6, 2013.
- Hudson, John (August 13, 2013). "Exclusive: After Multiple Denials, CIA Admits to Snooping on Noam Chomsky". Foreign Policy. Archived from the original on December 11, 2021.
- Hutton, Christopher (April 30, 2020). "Linguistics and the state: How funding and politics shape a field". International Journal of the Sociology of Language (263): 31–36. doi:10.1515/ijsl-2020-2079. S2CID 219168139.
- Huxley, John (June 2, 2011). "Sydney Peace Prize goes to Chomsky". The Sydney Morning Herald. Archived from the original on August 14, 2021.
- Zeng, Daniel (August 1, 2011). "AI's Hall of Fame". IEEE Intelligent Systems. 26 (4): 5–15. Bibcode:2011IISys..26d...5Z. doi:10.1109/MIS.2011.64.
- "Interview: Noam Chomsky Speaks Out On Education and Power". Soundtracksforthem. September 20, 2005. Archived from the original on May 13, 2011.
- "Israel: Chomsky ban 'big mistake'". Al Jazeera. May 20, 2010. Archived from the original on October 14, 2019.
- Jaggi, Maya (January 20, 2001). "Conscience of a nation". The Guardian. Archived from the original on January 11, 2015.
- "Jamia Millia Islamia named a complex honoring Noam Chomsky". Jamia Millia Islamia. May 3, 2007. Archived from the original on April 27, 2021.
- Kalman, Matthew (January 19, 2014). "Palestinians Divided Over Boycott of Israeli Universities". The New York Times. ISSN 0362-4331. Archived from the original on August 16, 2021.
- Kay, Jonathan (May 12, 2011). "The Monomania of an Anti-American Prophet". Commentary. Archived from the original on January 7, 2016.
- Keller, Katherine (November 12, 2007). "Writer, Creator, Journalist, and Uppity Woman: Ann Nocenti". Sequential Tart. Archived from the original on September 4, 2015.
- Knight, Chris (2016). Decoding Chomsky: Science and Revolutionary Politics. Yale University Press. ISBN 978-0300228762.
- Knight, Chris (March 12, 2018a). "When the Pentagon Looked to Chomsky's Linguistics for their Weapons Systems". 3 Quarks Daily. Archived from the original on November 25, 2021.
- Knuth, Donald (2002). "Preface". Selected Papers on Computer Languages. Center for the Study of Language and Information. ISBN 978-1-57586-381-8.
- Knuth, Donald E. (2003). "Preface: a mathematical theory of language in which I could use a computer programmer's intuition". Selected Papers on Computer Languages. CSLI Publications, Center for the Study of Language and Information. p. 1. ISBN 1-57586-382-0 – via Internet Archive.
- Knuth: Selected Papers on Computer Languages. Stanford University. 2003. ISBN 1575863812. Archived from the original on August 20, 2018.
- Koerner, E. F. K. (1978). "Towards a historiography of linguistics". Toward a Historiography of Linguistics: Selected Essays. John Benjamins. pp. 21–54.
- Koerner, E. F. K. (1983). "The Chomskyan 'revolution' and its historiography: a few critical remarks". Language & Communication. 3 (2): 147–169. doi:10.1016/0271-5309(83)90012-5.
- Kozloff, Nikolas (September 22, 2012). "Chomsky, Ali, and the failure to challenge the authoritarian left". Al Jazeera. Archived from the original on April 27, 2023.
- "Lecture 6: Evolutionary Psychology, Problem Solving, and 'Machiavellian' Intelligence". School of Psychology, Massey University. 1996. Archived from the original on January 17, 2007.
- "Let me introduce myself – leafcutter bee Megachile chomskyi from Texas". Pensoft. Archived from the original on February 14, 2022.
- Landau, Saul (February 21, 1988). "Noam Chomsky and the Tyranny of the Privileged". The Washington Post. ISSN 0190-8286. Archived from the original on November 25, 2022.
- Lott, Jeremy (April 1, 2006). "I'm OK—You're a Hypocrite". Reason.com. Archived from the original on April 5, 2023.
- Lyons, John (1978). Noam Chomsky (revised ed.). Harmondsworth: Penguin. ISBN 978-0-14-004370-9 – via Internet Archive.
- MacCorquodale, Kenneth (January 1970). "On Chomsky's review of Skinner's Verbal Behavior". Journal of the Experimental Analysis of Behavior. 13 (1): 83–99. doi:10.1901/jeab.1970.13-83. ISSN 0022-5002. PMC 1333660.
- Mace, Mikayla (August 18, 2017). "Linguist Noam Chomsky joins University of Arizona faculty". Arizona Daily Star. Archived from the original on April 27, 2021.
- Macintyre, Donald (May 17, 2010). "Chomsky refused entry into West Bank". The Independent. Archived from the original on June 12, 2018.
- McGilvray, James (2014). Chomsky: Language, Mind, Politics (2nd ed.). Cambridge: Polity. ISBN 978-0-7456-4989-4.
- McNeill, David (February 22, 2014). "Noam Chomsky: Truth to power". The Japan Times. Archived from the original on November 24, 2021.
- Milne, Seumas (November 7, 2009). "'US foreign policy is straight out of the mafia'". The Guardian. Archived from the original on December 16, 2021.
- Nettelfield, Lara J. (2010). Courting Democracy in Bosnia and Herzegovina. Cambridge University Press. ISBN 978-0521763806. Archived from the original on August 16, 2021.
- "Nikolic presented the Sretenje Order" Николић уручио Сретењско ордење. Politika (in Serbian). February 15, 2015. Archived from the original on February 5, 2021.
- "Noam Chomsky". MIT Linguistics Program. 2002. Archived from the original on September 17, 2015 – via chomsky.info.
- "Noam Chomsky". Contemporary Authors Online. Biography in Context. Detroit, MI: Gale. 2016. Archived from the original on February 14, 2022.
- "Noam Chomsky Awarded 2011 US Peace Prize". US Memorial Peace Foundation. Archived from the original on March 9, 2021.
- "Noam Chomsky on Life & Love: Still Going at 86, Renowned Dissident is Newly Married". Democracy Now!. March 3, 2015. Archived from the original on June 10, 2021.
- O'Grady, Cathleen (June 8, 2015). "MIT claims to have found a "language universal" that ties all languages together". Ars Technica. doi:10.1073/pnas.1502134112. Archived from the original on December 15, 2021.
- "The one hundred most influential works in cognitive science". Center for Cognitive Sciences, Minnesota State University. Archived from the original on August 16, 2021.
- Ortiz, Aimee (August 28, 2017). "Chomsky joins University of Arizona faculty". The Boston Globe. Archived from the original on December 20, 2018.
- Otero, Carlos Peregrín (2003). "Editor's notes to Selection 4 ("Perspectives on language and mind")". Chomsky on Democracy & Education. By Chomsky, Noam. Otero, Carlos Peregrín (ed.). Psychology Press. p. 416. ISBN 978-0415926324. Archived from the original on August 18, 2021.
- Páez, Nadia (2019). "Systematics of Huicundomantis, a new subgenus of Pristimantis (Anura, Strabomantidae) with extraordinary cryptic diversity and eleven new species". ZooKeys (868): 1–112. Bibcode:2019ZooK..868....1P. doi:10.3897/zookeys.868.26766. ISSN 1313-2970. PMC 6687670. PMID 31406482.
- Persson, Ingmar; LaFollette, Hugh, eds. (2013). The Blackwell Guide to Ethical Theory (2nd ed.). John Wiley & Sons. ISBN 978-1-118-51426-9.
- Pilkington, Ed (May 16, 2010). "Noam Chomsky barred by Israelis from lecturing in Palestinian West Bank". The Guardian. Archived from the original on August 17, 2021.
- "Press release: Séan MacBride Peace Prize 2017" (PDF). Berlin: International Peace Bureau. September 6, 2017. Archived (PDF) from the original on February 25, 2021.
- Prickett, Stephen (2002). Narrative, Religion and Science: Fundamentalism Versus Irony, 1700–1999. Cambridge University Press. p. 234. ISBN 978-0-521-00983-6 – via Internet Archive.
- "Prospect/FP Top 100 Public Intellectuals Results". Foreign Policy. October 15, 2005. Archived from the original on October 25, 2005.
- Pullum, Geoffrey; Scholz, Barbara (2002). "Empirical assessment of stimulus poverty arguments" (PDF). The Linguistic Review. 18 (1–2): 9–50. doi:10.1515/tlir.19.1-2.9. S2CID 143735248. Archived (PDF) from the original on February 3, 2021.
- Rabbani, Mouin (2012). "Reflections on a Lifetime of Engagement with Zionism, the Palestine Question, and American Empire: An Interview with Noam Chomsky". Journal of Palestine Studies. 41 (3): 92–120. doi:10.1525/jps.2012.XLI.3.92. Archived from the original on August 3, 2012.
- Radick, Gregory (2007). The Simian Tongue: The Long Debate about Animal Language. University of Chicago Press. ISBN 978-0226702247 – via Internet Archive.
- Rai, Milan (1995). Chomsky's Politics. Verso. ISBN 978-1-85984-011-5 – via Internet Archive.
- Robinson, Paul (February 25, 1979). "The Chomsky Problem". The New York Times. ISSN 0362-4331. Archived from the original on December 23, 2021.
- Rohrmeier, Martin (2007). Spyridis, Georgaki; Kouroupetroglou, Anagnostopoulou (eds.). "A generative grammar approach to diatonic harmonic structure" (PDF). Proceedings of the 4th Sound and Music Computing Conference: 97–100. Archived (PDF) from the original on August 14, 2021.
- Ruiter, J. P. de; Levinson, Stephen C. (October 2010). "A biological infrastructure for communication underlies the cultural evolution of languages". Behavioral and Brain Sciences. 31 (5): 518. doi:10.1017/S0140525X08005086. hdl:11858/00-001M-0000-0013-1FE2-5. ISSN 1469-1825.
- "SASA Member". Serbian Academy of Sciences and Arts. October 30, 2003. Archived from the original on March 4, 2016.
- Schweizer, Peter (January 30, 2006). "Noam Chomsky, Closet Capitalist". Hoover Institution. Archived from the original on May 23, 2023.
- Searle, John R. (June 29, 1972). "A Special Supplement: Chomsky's Revolution in Linguistics". The New York Review of Books. Archived from the original on March 21, 2015.
- Sengupta, Kim (May 12, 2015). "Turkey and Saudi Arabia alarm the West by backing Islamist extremists the Americans had bombed in Syria". The Independent. Archived from the original on May 13, 2015.
- Seuren, Pieter A. M. (1998). Western linguistics: An historical introduction. Wiley-Blackwell. ISBN 0-631-20891-7.
- Sipser, Michael (1997). Introduction to the Theory of Computation. PWS Publishing. ISBN 978-0-534-94728-6 – via Internet Archive.
- Slife, Brent D. (1993). Time and Psychological Explanation: The Spectacle of Spain's Tourist Boom and the Reinvention of Difference. SUNY Press. p. 115. ISBN 978-0-7914-1469-9 – via Internet Archive.
- Smith, Neil (2004). Chomsky: Ideas and Ideals. Cambridge University Press. p. 185. ISBN 978-0521546881 – via Internet Archive.
- Sperlich, Wolfgang B. (2006). Noam Chomsky. Reaktion Books. ISBN 978-1-86189-269-0 – via Internet Archive.
- Steedman, Mark J. (October 1, 1984). "A Generative Grammar for Jazz Chord Sequences". Music Perception. 2 (1): 52–77. doi:10.2307/40285282. JSTOR 40285282.
- Swartz, Aaron (May 15, 2006). "The Book That Changed My Life". Raw Thought. Archived from the original on November 17, 2013.
- Szabó, Zoltán Gendler (2010). "Chomsky, Noam Avram (1928–)". In Shook, John R. (ed.). The Dictionary of Modern American Philosophers. Continuum. ISBN 978-0-19-975466-3. Archived from the original on April 27, 2021.
- Tanenhaus, Sam (October 31, 2016). "Noam Chomsky and the Bicycle Theory". The New York Times. ISSN 0362-4331. Archived from the original on October 18, 2021.
- Thornbury, Scott (2006). An A–Z of ELT (Methodology). Oxford: Macmillan Education. p. 234. ISBN 978-1405070638.
- Tomasello, Michael (January 1995). "Language is not an instinct". Cognitive Development. 10 (1): 131–156. doi:10.1016/0885-2014(95)90021-7. ISSN 0885-2014.
- Tomasello, Michael (2003). Constructing a Language: A Usage-Based Theory of Language Acquisition. Cambridge, MA: Harvard University Press. ISBN 978-0-674-01030-7.
- Tomasello, Michael (October 2009). "Universal grammar is dead". Behavioral and Brain Sciences. 32 (5): 470–471. doi:10.1017/S0140525X09990744. ISSN 1469-1825. S2CID 144188188.
- "Tool Module: Chomsky's Universal Grammar". The Brain From Top To Bottom. McGill University. Archived from the original on September 10, 2017.
- Tymoczko, Tom; Henle, Jim (2004). Sweet Reason: A Field Guide to Modern Logic. Springer Science & Business Media. p. 101. ISBN 978-0-387-98930-3. Archived from the original on April 28, 2021.
- "U.S., Britain ignored 'culture of terrorism': Chomsky". The Hindu. November 4, 2001. Archived from the original on December 24, 2016.
- "Viggo Mortensen's Spoken Word & Music CDs". Archived from the original on December 15, 2010.
- Weaver, Matthew (January 14, 2016). "Chomsky hits back at Erdoğan, accusing him of double standards on terrorism". The Guardian. Archived from the original on November 13, 2021.
- Weidenfeld, Lisa (August 29, 2017). "Noam Chomsky Is Leaving MIT for the University of Arizona". Boston Magazine. Archived from the original on August 17, 2021. "Chomsky has been at MIT since 1955, and retired in 2002."
- Weiner, Tim (December 10, 1995). "The C.I.A.'s most Important Mission: Itself". The New York Times. ISSN 0362-4331. Archived from the original on May 10, 2021.
