= Getting Haiti Right This Time =

2004 book by Noam Chomsky

Getting Haiti Right This Time: The U.S. and the Coup
- Author: Noam Chomsky; Paul Farmer; Amy Goodman
- Language: English
- Genre: Non-fiction
- Publisher: Common Courage
- Publication date: 2004
- ISBN: 978-1-56751-318-9

Getting Haiti Right This Time: The U.S. and the Coup is a 2004 book by Noam Chomsky, Paul Farmer and Amy Goodman.
