= Profit over People =

1999 book by Noam Chomsky

Profit Over People: Neoliberalism and Global Order
- The American book cover
- Author: Noam Chomsky
- Language: English
- Subject: Critique of neoliberalism
- Publisher: Seven Stories Press
- Publication date: November 1999
- Publication place: United States
- Media type: Paperback
- Pages: 175
- ISBN: 1-888363-82-7
- Dewey Decimal: 330.12/2 21
- LC Class: HB95 .C516 1999

Profit Over People: Neoliberalism and Global Order is a 1999 book by Noam Chomsky, published by Seven Stories Press. It contains his critique of neoliberalism.

Chomsky argues that the doctrines and development of a pro-corporate system, consisting of economic and political policies that restrict the public arena and support private power, acts essentially as a social hierarchy which places the drive for profit over the wider needs of the population. Moreover, Chomsky also indicates the harmful effects of policies that are prescribed to poor countries from institutions such as the International Monetary Fund, World Trade Organization and the World Bank.

== See also ==
- Classical liberalism
- Economic development
- Globalization
- Multilateral Agreement on Investment
- North American Free Trade Agreement
- Washington Consensus
