= Louis Kampf =

American professor of literature

Louis Kampf (May 12, 1929 – May 30, 2020) was an American professor of literature and former president of the Modern Language Association.

Louis Kampf was born on May 12, 1929 in Vienna, to Orthodox Jewish parents from Galicia. In 1938 he fled the Nazis with his parents, and, via Belgium, France, and Morocco, arrived in the United States in 1941. He attended George Washington High School in New York City, then Long Island University on a basketball scholarship, and then graduate school in comparative literature at the University of Iowa. From 1958 to 1961, he was a Junior Fellow at Harvard University, the last year of which he spent at the American Academy in Rome.

Kampf taught in the Massachusetts Institute of Technology Humanities Department from 1961 to 1995 and was literature chair from 1967-1969. His 1967 book, On Modernism; The Prospects for Literature and Freedom, combined an aesthetic category—literature--with a political category—freedom—to examine how western cultural movements emerged and where in art and education they might be headed. At the 1968 convention of the Modern Language Association in New York City, an uprising in protest of the Vietnam War led to his election as second vice-president and succession to the presidency of the organization in 1970.

In his 34 years at MIT, Kampf helped found the Women’s Studies program, team-taught “Intellectuals and Social Change” with Noam Chomsky, and created a variety of innovative courses. He served on the editorial boards of the Feminist Press and of Signs: A Journal of Women and Culture, and was a founding editor of Radical Teacher. Upon his retirement, the Louis Kampf Writing Prize in Women's and Gender Studies was established in his honor.

A committed political activist, Kampf helped found Resist, the New University Conference, and the Cambridge-Bethlehem Sister-City Project.

Kampf was married to journalist and academic, Ellen Cantarow. He shared the last 30 years of his life with his partner, Jean Jackson, professor emerita of anthropology at MIT.

Louis Kampf died on May 30, 2020, in Cambridge, Massachusetts.

== Books ==
- On Modernism; The Prospects for Literature and Freedom, MIT Press, 1967.
- The Politics of Literature: Dissenting Essays on the Teaching of English, edited with Paul Lauter, Pantheon, 1972.
