= Reflections on Language =

1975 book by Noam Chomsky

- First edition
- Author: Noam Chomsky
- Subject: Social science
- Publisher: Random House
- Publication date: 1975
- Pages: 269

Reflections on Language is a 1975 book in which MIT linguist Noam Chomsky argues for a rationalist approach to human nature. Under this approach, specific capabilities are innate to humans, as opposed to an empiricist approach, in which there is no innate human nature but rather a "blank slate" upon which psychological and social forces act. The New York Times selected the book as among the year's best.

== Contents ==
- Chapter 1. On Cognitive Capacity
- Chapter 2. The Object of Inquiry
- Chapter 3. Some General Features of Language
- Chapter 4. Problems and Mysteries in the Study of Human Language

== Bibliography ==
- Raiser, William L. (1977). "Review of Reflections on Language". Contemporary Sociology. 6 (2): 188–189. doi:10.2307/2065793. ISSN 0094-3061. JSTOR 2065793.
