= Middle East Illusions =

2003 book by Noam Chomsky

- First edition
- Author: Noam Chomsky
- Language: English
- Genre: Non-fiction
- Publisher: Rowman & Littlefield
- Publication date: 2003

Middle East Illusions: Including Peace in the Middle East? Reflections on Justice and Nationhood is a 2003 book by Noam Chomsky. It includes a collection of essays about the Israeli–Palestinian conflict written between 1969 and 2002.
