= How the World Works =

Book by Noam Chomsky

- Editor: Arthur Naiman
- Author: Noam Chomsky
- Language: English
- Subject: Politics
- English publication date: 2011
- ISBN: 978-1593764272

How the World Works is the title of a 2011 book by American professor, linguist, political analyst, and philosopher Noam Chomsky. It consists of five books by Noam Chomsky: What Uncle Sam Really Wants, The Prosperous Few and the Restless Many, Secrets, Lies and Democracy, and The Common Good. The speeches and interviews collected in How the World Works were given in the 1990s and some in the late 1980s. The book was edited by Arthur Naiman.

== Content ==
In his book How the World Works, Noam Chomsky exposes the destructive foreign policy of the United States in other countries, mainly in Third World countries, with the support of dictatorships and other unethical methods with the ultimate goal of the financial profit of the corporations that govern the United States. Another issue that the author touches on in his book is the exploitation and oppression of the poor by the rich both within the United States and in general around the world. At the same time, the media is criticized, which are used as a tool to manipulate people's thinking and never allow them to know the truth. Thus, the great ones can work peacefully for their own profits. Noam Chomsky does not have a magic answer for the enormous problems that he analyzes. As he writes at the end of the book, "I don’t think it’s my job to tell people what they should do – they should think for themselves. I don’t know what I should do here either. So I’m just trying to describe what’s going on as best I can.", while elsewhere in the book he states that the answer to how people can change the world is organization: "Organize. Just organize." As he writes: "There’s only one way to deal with these issues. If everyone is alone, they can’t do anything. All they can do is lament the situation. But if they unite with others, they can make a difference. We can do a million things, depending on where we direct our efforts."

=== What Uncle Sam Really Wants ===
In this book, Noam Chomsky presents the atrocities of the United States, after World War II, in countries such as Laos, Grenada, El Salvador, Nicaragua, Guatemala, Panama, Vietnam, Greece, etc. At the same time, the cooperation of the United States with collaborators of fascists and Nazis is exposed with the aim of combating anti-fascist resistance around the world and establishing "stability", that is, security and enrichment for the upper classes and large foreign businesses. In addition, the fear of the United States for the "threat of good example", that is, countries that fight for justice, democracy, independence, etc. is particularly emphasized. The book also includes excerpts from documents from US policymakers, which reveal the essential opposition of the US to idealistic criteria such as human rights, rising living standards and democratization, because these "vague and unachievable goals" can "corrode" the world's sovereign.

=== The Prosperous Few and the Restless Many ===
This book presents the global economic system, according to which the Third World model is established everywhere: a two-tier society, that is, a layer of extreme wealth and privilege and a layer of immense misery and despair consisting of useless and superfluous people. At the same time, various other issues are examined, such as racism and class differences, which, while they exist to an extreme degree, a major propaganda effort is being made to hide and silence them. In this book, Noam Chomsky also expresses the opinion that everyone knows from experience almost everything that can be thought of about human beings, how they act and why, if they sit down to think about it. "This is not quantum physics."

=== Secrets, Lies and Democracy ===
The book Secrets, Lies and Democracy states that corporations try to maximize their profits, power, market share, and control the state. Sometimes what they do helps other people, but only by chance. Noam Chomsky, writing about health, points out that what ordinary people want is called “politically unachievable,” and this means, in simple terms, that the large centers of power and privilege oppose it. Other topics explored in the book include crime, gun ownership, the CIA and its often illegal missions on behalf of the government, the media, debauchery, chauvinism, and the stupidity often caused by mass hysteria about spectacular sports, religious fundamentalism, ever-increasing social inequality, etc.

=== The Common Good ===
In the last book of the project, among many others, concepts such as equality, freedom, power, globalization, etc. are examined.
