= Language and Mind =

1968 book by Noam Chomsky

- First edition
- Author: Noam Chomsky
- Subject: Linguistics
- Publisher: Harcourt Brace
- Publication date: 1968
- Pages: 88

Language and Mind is a 1968 book of three essays on linguistics by Noam Chomsky. An expanded edition in 1972 added three essays and a new preface.

== Bibliography ==
- Harman, Gilbert (1973). "Review of Language and Mind". Language. 49 (2): 453–464. doi:10.2307/412464. ISSN 0097-8507. JSTOR 412464. S2CID 60438898.
