= Letters from Lexington =

1993 book by Noam Chomsky

- First edition
- Author: Noam Chomsky
- Publisher: Common Courage Press
- Publication date: 1993

Letters from Lexington: Reflections on Propaganda, first published in 1993, contains Noam Chomsky's criticism of the American media. The articles are available in parts on the Noam Chomsky Archive.

== Contents ==
Foreword by Edward S. Herman

1. What Makes the Mainstream Media Mainstream
2. The Middle East Lie
3. Defensive Aggression
4. The Sunday Times Makes for a Day of No Rest
5. Notes on the Culture of Democracy
6. Third World, First Threat
7. Yearning for Democracy
8. Apostles of Nonviolence
9. UN = US
10. Postscript: "Riding Moynihan's Hobby Horse"
11. Our "Sense of Moral Purpose"
12. "We the People"
13. Bringing Peace
14. The Burdens of Responsibility
15. The Death and Life of Stalinism
16. Toxic Omissions
17. "Fiendish Acts"
18. The PC Thought Police
19. Rest in Peace
20. Class struggle as Usual
