= The Fateful Triangle =

1983 book on US policy in Israel–Palestine by Noam Chomsky

The Fateful Triangle: The United States, Israel and the Palestinians
- Author: Noam Chomsky
- Publisher: Haymarket Books US; South End Press US; Between the Lines Books Canada
- Publication date: 1983, October 1999 (updated), February 2015 (updated)
- Media type: Print (Paperback)
- Pages: 578
- ISBN: 9781608463992
- OCLC: 40545413
- Dewey Decimal: 327.7305694 21
- LC Class: E183.8.I7 C48 1999

The Fateful Triangle: The United States, Israel and the Palestinians is a 1983 book by Noam Chomsky about the relationship between the US, Israel and Palestine. Chomsky examines the origins of this relationship and its meaningful consequences for the Palestinians and other Arabs. The book mainly concentrates on the 1982 Lebanon War and the pro-Zionist bias of most US media and intellectuals, as Chomsky puts it.

The book was updated in 1999 and contains three new chapters, drawing upon material from Z Magazine and other publications. New developments that have been incorporated include the First Intifada, the Israeli invasion of Lebanon, and the ongoing peace process. The book was re-released by Haymarket Books in 2015.

Edward Said, who also contributed the new foreword, said, "Chomsky's major claim is that Israel and the United States – especially the latter – are rejectionists opposed to peace, whereas the Arabs, including the PLO, for years have been trying to accommodate themselves to the reality of Israel."
