= The Responsibility of Intellectuals =

1967 essay by Noam Chomsky

The Responsibility of Intellectuals is an essay by the American academic Noam Chomsky, which was published as a special supplement by The New York Review of Books on 23 February 1967.

== Content ==
The article was written during the then-ongoing Vietnam War, as news of human rights abuses started to return to the United States, and as the war had increasingly become seen as a quagmire. An attack on the intellectual culture in the U.S., Chomsky argues that it is largely subservient to power. He is particularly critical of social scientists and technocrats, who he argued were providing a pseudo-scientific justification for the crimes of the state in regard to the Vietnam War. He notes that those who opposed the war on moral rather than technical grounds are "often psychologists, mathematicians, chemists, or philosophers, ... rather than people with Washington contacts, who, of course, realize that 'had they a new, good idea about Vietnam, they would get a prompt and respectful hearing' in Washington."

The topic was inspired by articles of Dwight Macdonald published after the Second World War who "asks the question: To what extent were the German or Japanese people responsible for the atrocities committed by their governments? And, quite properly, ... turns the question back to us: To what extent are the British or American people responsible for the vicious terror bombings of civilians, perfected as a technique of warfare by the Western democracies and reaching their culmination in Hiroshima and Nagasaki, surely among the most unspeakable crimes in history."

The article brought Chomsky to public attention as one of the leading American intellectuals in the movement against the Vietnam war.

Let me finally return to Dwight Macdonald and the responsibility of intellectuals. Macdonald quotes an interview with a death-camp paymaster who burst into tears when told that the Russians would hang him. "Why should they? What have I done?" he asked. Macdonald concludes: "Only those who are willing to resist authority themselves when it conflicts too intolerably with their personal moral code, only they have the right to condemn the death-camp paymaster." The question, "What have I done?" is one that we may well ask ourselves, as we read each day of fresh atrocities in Vietnam—as we create, or mouth, or tolerate the deceptions that will be used to justify the next defense of freedom.

— Chomsky, "The Responsibility of Intellectuals" 1967

== 50th anniversary conference ==
In February 2017, on the 50th anniversary of the essay's publication, a conference was held at University College London. In 2019, a book based on this conference was published entitled, The Responsibility of Intellectuals: Reflections by Noam Chomsky and others after 50 years and edited by three Chomsky biographers, Nicholas Allott, Chris Knight and Neil Smith. University College London attempted to impose restrictions on what could be said at the book launch. Chomsky described this as an "utter outrage" and the restrictions were eventually dropped.

With respect to the responsibility of intellectuals, there are still other, equally disturbing questions. Intellectuals are in a position to expose the lies of governments, to analyze actions according to their causes and motives and often hidden intentions. In the Western world, at least, they have the power that comes from political liberty, from access to information and freedom of expression. For a privileged minority, Western democracy provides the leisure, the facilities, and the training to seek the truth lying hidden behind the veil of distortion and misrepresentation, ideology and class interest, through which the events of current history are presented to us. The responsibilities of intellectuals, then, are much deeper than what Macdonald calls the “responsibility of people,” given the unique privileges that intellectuals enjoy.

— Chomsky, "The Responsibility of Intellectuals" 1967

== See also ==
- Intellectual responsibility – the more general concept found in philosophy
