= Noam Chomsky bibliography and filmography =

This is a list of writings published by the American writer Noam Chomsky.

== Books and articles by Chomsky ==
=== General ===
- (2006). The Chomsky–Foucault Debate: On Human Nature (with Michel Foucault). New York: The New Press, distributed by W.W. Norton.
- (2015). What Kind of Creatures Are We?. Columbia University Press. ISBN 978-0-231-17596-8.

=== Linguistics ===
A full bibliography is available on Chomsky's MIT homepage.

- — (1951). Morphophonemics of Modern Hebrew (Master's thesis). University of Pennsylvania.
- — (Sep 1953). "Systems of Syntactic Analysis" (PDF). The Journal of Symbolic Logic. 18 (3): 242–256. doi:10.2307/2267409. JSTOR 2267409. S2CID 11796020. Archived from the original (PDF) on 2014-03-08.
- — (Jan 1955). "Logical Syntax and Semantics: Their Linguistic Relevance" (PDF). Language. 31 (1): 36–45. doi:10.2307/410891. JSTOR 410891. Archived from the original (PDF) on 2015-01-31.
- (1955). Logical Structure of Linguistic Theory. (A typescript Chomsky wrote in preparation for his PhD thesis, including hand-written notes made in preparation for the 1975 book, is available as a 149 MiB, 919 page PDF.)
- — (Jun 1955). Transformational Analysis (Ph.D.). University of Pennsylvania. Archived from the original on July 15, 2014.
- —; Halle, Morris; Lukoff, Fred (11 October 1956). "On Accent and Juncture in English". In Halle, Morris; Lunt, Horace; McLean, Hugh; van Schooneveld, Cornelis (eds.). For Roman Jakobson. Essays on the occasion of his sixtieth birthday. The Hague: Mouton. pp. 65–80.
- — (1956). "Three models for the description of language" (PDF). IRE Transactions on Information Theory. 2 (3): 113–124. Bibcode:1956IRTIT...2..113C. doi:10.1109/tit.1956.1056813. S2CID 19519474. Archived from the original (PDF) on 2010-09-19.
- — (1957). Syntactic Structures. The Hague: Mouton. ISBN 3-11-017279-8.
- —; George A. Miller (1957). Pattern Conception (Technical report). ASTIA. Document AD110076.
- —; George A. Miller (1958). "Finite State Languages". Inform. And Control. 1 (2): 91–112. doi:10.1016/s0019-9958(58)90082-2.
- — (1959). "On Certain Formal Properties of Grammars". Information and Control. 2 (2): 137–167. doi:10.1016/s0019-9958(59)90362-6.
- — (1959). "A Note on Phrase Structure Grammars". Information and Control. 2 (4): 393–395. doi:10.1016/s0019-9958(59)80017-6.
- — (1961). "On the Notion ``Rule of Grammar". Proc. 12th Symp. Applied Math. Am. Math. Soc. pp. 6–24. — Proceedings as E-Book
- — (1962). Context-Free Grammars and Pushdown Storage (Technical report). M.I.T. Research Laboratory of Electronics. 65.
- — (1962). "The Logical Basis for Linguistic Theory". Proc. 9th Int. Cong. Linguists Cambridge/MA.
- —; George A. Miller (1963). "Introduction to the Formal Analysis of Natural Languages". In R.R. Bush and E. Galanter and R.D. Luce (ed.). Handbook of Mathematical Psychology. Vol. 2. Wiley. pp. 269–321.
- —; Marcel-Paul Schützenberger (1963). P. Braffort and D. Hirschberg (ed.). The algebraic theory of context free languages (PDF). Studies in Logic and the Foundations of Mathematics. North Holland. pp. 118–161.
- — (1964). Current Issues in Linguistic Theory. The Hague: Mouton.
- — (1965). Aspects of the Theory of Syntax. Cambridge: The MIT Press. ISBN 0-262-53007-4.
- — (1965). Cartesian Linguistics. New York: Harper and Row. (Reprint: — (1986). Cartesian Linguistics. A Chapter in the History of Rationalist Thought. Lanham, Maryland: University Press of America.)
- (1966). Topics in the Theory of Generative Grammar.
- (1968) with Morris Halle. The Sound Pattern of English. New York: Harper & Row.
- (1968). Language and Mind.
- (1971). The Case Against B.F. Skinner. New York Review of Books, December 30, 1971.
- (1972). Studies on Semantics in Generative Grammar.
- (1975). The Logical Structure of Linguistic Theory.
- — (1975). Reflections on Language. New York: Pantheon Books. ISBN 0-394-49956-5.
- (1977). Essays on Form and Interpretation.
- (1979). Morphophonemics of Modern Hebrew.
- (1980). Language and Learning: The Debate between Jean Piaget and Noam Chomsky (edited by Massimo Piattelli-Palmarini). Cambridge: Harvard University Press.
- (1980). Rules and Representations.
- (1981). Lectures on Government and Binding. Holland: Foris Publications. Reprint. 7th Edition. Berlin and New York: Mouton de Gruyter, 1993.
- (1982). Some Concepts and Consequences of the Theory of Government and Binding.
- (1982). Language and the Study of Mind.
- (1982). Noam Chomsky on The Generative Enterprise, A discussion with Riny Huybregts and Henk van Riemsdijk.
- (1984). Modular Approaches to the Study of the Mind.
- (1986). Knowledge of Language: Its Nature, Origin, and Use.
- (1986). Barriers. Linguistic Inquiry Monograph Thirteen. Cambridge, MA and London: The MIT Press.
- (1987). Language in a Psychological Setting. Tokyo: Sophia University.
- (1988). Language and Problems of Knowledge: The Managua Lectures. Cambridge, MA: The MIT Press.
- (1988). Language and Politics. Montreal: Black Rose Books.
- (1993). Language and Thought.
- (1995). The Minimalist Program. Cambridge, MA: The MIT Press.
- (1998). On Language.
- (2000). New Horizons in the Study of Language and Mind. ISBN 0-521-65822-5.
- (2000). The Architecture of Language (Mukherji, et al., eds.).
- (2001). On Nature and Language (Adriana Belletti and Luigi Rizzi, ed.).
- (2004). The Generative Enterprise Revisited: Discussions with Riny Huybregts, Henk van Riemsdijk, Naoki Fukui, and Mihoko Zushi, with a new foreword by Noam Chomsky. Berlin: Mouton de Gruyter.
- (2009). Of Minds and Language: A Dialogue with Noam Chomsky in the Basque Country (edited by Massimo Piattelli-Palmarini, Juan Uriagereka, and Pello Salaburu). Oxford: Oxford University Press.
- (2012) with James McGilvray. The Science of Language. Cambridge University Press. ISBN 978-1-107-60240-3.
- (2016) with Robert C. Berwick. Why only us? Language and Evolution. Cambridge, MA: The MIT Press.

=== Politics ===
Some of the books and articles are available for viewing online.

- (1967) "The Responsibility of Intellectuals"
- (1969) Perspectives on Vietnam [microform]
- (1969) American Power and the New Mandarins. New York: Pantheon. ISBN 978-0-14-021126-9
- (1970) At War with Asia. New York: Pantheon. ISBN 978-0-394-46210-3
- (1970) Two Essays on Cambodia. ISBN 978-0-9500300-6-7
- (1971) Chomsky: Selected Readings. ISBN 978-0-19-437046-2
- (1972) Problems of Knowledge and Freedom: The Russell Lectures. New York: Pantheon. ISBN 978-0-394-71815-6
- (1972) The Pentagon Papers. Senator Gravel ed. vol. V. Critical Essays. Boston: Beacon Press; includes index to vol. I-IV of the Papers. With Howard Zinn.
- (1973) For Reasons of State. New York: Pantheon. ISBN 978-0-00-211242-0
- (1973) The Backroom Boys. Fontana. ISBN 9780002160537
- (1973) Counter-Revolutionary Violence – Bloodbaths in Fact & Propaganda (with Edward S. Herman). Andover, MA: Warner Modular. Module no. # 57.
- (1974) Peace in the Middle East? Reflections on Justice and Nationhood. New York: Pantheon. ISBN 978-0-394-71248-2
- (1976) Intellectuals and the State. ISBN 978-90-293-9671-4
- (1978) Human Rights and American Foreign Policy. ISBN 978-0-85124-201-9
- (1979) Language and Responsibility. New York: Pantheon. ISBN 978-0-85527-535-8
- (1979) The Political Economy of Human Rights, Volume I: The Washington Connection and Third World Fascism (with Edward S. Herman) ISBN 0-85124-248-0 ISBN 0-89608-090-0
- (1979) The Political Economy of Human Rights, Volume II: After the Cataclysm: Postwar Indochina and the Reconstruction of Imperial Ideology (with Edward S. Herman) ISBN 0-85124-272-3 ISBN 978-0-89608-100-0
- (1982, 2003) Radical Priorities. Montréal: Black Rose, ISBN 0-919619-50-3; Stirling, Scotland: AK Press. Otero, C.P.
- (1982) Superpowers in Collision: The Cold War Now (with Jonathan Steele and John Gittings). ISBN 978-0-14-022432-0
- (1982) Towards a New Cold War: Essays on the Current Crisis and How We Got There. New York: Pantheon. ISBN 978-0-394-51873-2
- (1983, 1999) The Fateful Triangle: The United States, Israel, and the Palestinians. Boston: South End Press. ISBN 978-0-89608-601-2, ISBN 978-0-89608-187-1
- (1985) Turning the Tide: U.S. intervention in Central America and the Struggle for Peace. Boston: South End Press. ISBN 978-0-89608-266-3
- (1986) Pirates and Emperors: International Terrorism and the Real World. New York: Claremont Research and Publications. ISBN 0-685-17754-8
- (1986) The Race to Destruction: Its Rational Basis. ISBN 978-0-85124-517-1
- (1987) The Chomsky Reader. Peck, James (ed.). ISBN 0-394-75173-6 ISBN 978-0-394-75173-3
- (1987) On Power and Ideology: The Managua Lectures. Boston: South End Press. ISBN 978-0-89608-289-2
- (1987) Turning the Tide: the U.S. and Latin America. ISBN 978-0-89608-267-0
- (1988) The Culture of Terrorism. Boston: South End Press. ISBN 978-0-89608-334-9
- (1988) Language and Politics. Montréal: Black Rose. ISBN 978-0-921689-34-8
- (1988, 2002) Manufacturing Consent: The Political Economy of the Mass Media. New York: Pantheon.(with Edward S. Herman) ISBN 0-375-71449-9.
- (1989) Necessary Illusions. Boston: South End Press. ISBN 978-0-89608-366-0
- (1991) Terrorizing the Neighborhood: American Foreign Policy in the Post-Cold War Era. Stirling, Scotland: AK Press. ISBN 978-0-9627091-2-8
- (1991) Deterring Democracy. Verso. ISBN 0-374-52349-5.
- (1992) What Uncle Sam Really Wants. Berkeley: Odonian Press. ISBN 1-878825-01-1.
- (1992) Chronicles of Dissent: Interviews with David Barsamian. Monroe, ME: Common Courage Press. ISBN 0-921586-24-8.
- (1993) Letters from Lexington: Reflections on Propaganda. Monroe, ME: Common Courage Press.
- (1993, 2003) The Prosperous Few and the Restless Many. Berkeley: Odonian Press. * 2003 edition by Pluto Press. ISBN 1-878825-03-8.
- (1993) Rethinking Camelot: JFK, the Vietnam War, and U.S. Political Culture. Boston: South End Press. ISBN 978-0-89608-458-2.
- (1993) World Order and Its Rules: Variations on Some Themes. West Belfast Economic for Mentation. ISBN 978-0-9521888-2-7
- (1993) Year 501: The Conquest Continues. Boston: South End Press. ISBN 1-895431-62-X, ISBN 1-895431-63-8.
- (1994) Keeping the Rabble in Line: Interviews with David Barsamian. Monroe, ME: Common Courage Press. ISBN 1-56751-032-9.
- (1994) Secrets, Lies, and Democracy. Berkley: Odonian Press. ISBN 1-878825-04-6.
- (1994) World Orders, Old and New. New York: Columbia University Press.
- (1996) Class Warfare: Interviews with David Barsamian. Monroe, ME: Common Courage Press. ISBN 1-56751-092-2.
- (1996,1997) Powers and Prospects: Reflections on Human Nature and the Social Order, Boston: South End Press, ISBN 0-89608-535-X /Perspectives on Power: Reflections on Human Nature and the Social Order, Montréal: Black Rose Press, ISBN 1-55164-048-1.
- (1997) Class Warfare: Interviewed by David Barsamian. Vancouver: New Star Books. (collects the Common Courage books, "Keeping the Rabble in Line" and "Class Warfare")
- (1997) Objectivity and Liberal Scholarship. Detroit: Red & Black. ISBN 978-0-934868-33-4.
- (1997) The Cold War and the University. Co-authored with Ira Katznelson, Richard Lewontin, David Montgomery, Laura Nader, Richard Ohmann, Ray Siever, Immanuel Wallerstein, Howard Zinn. ISBN 1-56584-005-4.
- (1997) Democracy in a Neoliberal Order: Doctrines and Reality. Cape Town: University of Cape Town.
- (1997, 2002). Media Control: The Spectacular Achievements of Propaganda. New York: Seven Stories Press. ISBN 978-1-58322-536-3.
- (1998) The Common Good. Odonian Press. ISBN 1-878825-08-9. ISBN 978-1-878825-08-7.
- (1999) Latin America: From Colonization to Globalization. Ocean Press. ASIN B000LCC67M
- (1999) Acts of Aggression: Policing "Rogue" States (with Edward Said). New York: Seven Stories Press. ISBN 978-1-58322-547-9.
- (1999) The New Military Humanism: Lessons from Kosovo. Common Courage Press
- (1999) Profit over People: Neoliberalism and Global Order. New York: Seven Stories Press. ISBN 978-1-888363-82-1.
- (2000) A New Generation Draws the Line: Kosovo, East Timor and the Standards of the West. Verso Books. ISBN 1-85984-789-7
- (2000) Rogue States: The Rule of Force in World Affairs. Cambridge: South End Press.
- (2001) Propaganda and the Public Mind. South End Press. ISBN 978-0-89608-634-0
- (2001) 9-11. New York: Seven Stories Press. ISBN 978-1-58322-489-2.
- (2002) The Umbrella of US Power: The Universal Declaration of Human Rights and the Contradictions of US Policy. New York: Seven Stories Press. ISBN 978-1-888363-85-2.
- (2002) Chomsky on Democracy and Education (edited by C.P. Otero). Routledge. ISBN 978-0-415-92632-4
- (2002) Pirates and Emperors, Old and New: International Terrorism and the Real World. Pluto Press. ISBN 0-7453-1980-7
- (2002) Peering into the Abyss of the Future. New Delhi: Institute of Social Sciences.
- (2002) Understanding Power: The Indispensable Chomsky. The New Press. ISBN 978-1-56584-703-3
- (2003) Power and Terror: Post-9/11 Talks and Interviews. New York: Seven Stories Press. ISBN 978-1-58322-590-5.
- (2003) Middle East Illusions: Including Peace in the Middle East? Reflections on Justice and Nationhood. Rowman & Littlefield Publishers. ISBN 0-7425-2977-0
- (2003) Hegemony or Survival: America's Quest for Global Dominance. Metropolitan Books. (Part of the American Empire Project).
- (2003) Deep Concerns, Znet article.
- (2004) Chomsky on Miseducation (edited by Donaldo Macedo). Lanham, MD: Rowman and Littlefield.
- (2004) Getting Haiti Right This Time: The U.S. and the Coup (with Amy Goodman and Paul Farmer). Common Courage Press. ISBN 1-56751-318-2
- (2005) Chomsky on Anarchism (ed Barry Pateman). AK Press. ISBN 1-904859-20-8
- (2005) Government in the Future. New York: Seven Stories Press. ISBN 978-1-58322-685-8.
- (2005) Imperial Ambitions: Conversations on the Post-9/11 World. Metropolitan Books. (Part of the American Empire Project). ISBN 0-8050-7967-X
- (2005) A Hated Political Enemy: Allen Bell interviews Noam Chomsky (with Allen Bell). Victoria, BC: Flask. ISBN 978-0-9736853-0-5
- (2006) Failed States: The Abuse of Power and the Assault on Democracy. Metropolitan Books. ISBN 0-8050-7912-2. ISBN 0-241-14323-3
- (2006) Perilous Power. The Middle East and US Foreign Policy. Dialogues on Terror, Democracy, War, and Justice (with Gilbert Achcar) ISBN 1-59451-312-0
- (2007) Interventions. City Lights. ISBN 0-87286-483-9. ISBN 978-0-87286-483-2
- (2007) What We Say Goes: Conversations on US Power in a Changing World. ISBN 0-8050-8671-4
- (2007) Inside Lebanon: Journey to A Shattered Land with Noam and Carol Chomsky (with A. J. Kfoury, et al.). New York: Monthly Review Press. ISBN 978-1-58367-153-5
- (2008) The Essential Chomsky. Vintage. ISBN 978-1-59558-189-1
- (2010) Hopes and Prospects. Haymarket Books. ISBN 978-1-931859-96-7
- (2010) New World of Indigenous Resistance. City Lights Publishers. ISBN 978-0-87286-533-4
- (2010) Making the Future: The Unipolar Imperial Moment. City Lights Publishers. ISBN 978-0-87286-537-2
- (2010) Gaza in Crisis: Reflections on Israel's War Against the Palestinians (with Ilan Pappé). Hamish Hamilton. ISBN 978-0-241-14506-7
- (2011) "Crisis and Hope: Theirs and Ours" in Steven Best; Richard Kahn; Anthony J. Nocella II; Peter McLaren (eds.). The Global Industrial Complex: Systems of Domination. Rowman & Littlefield. ISBN 978-0-7391-3698-0
- (2011) Scorched Earth: Legacies of Chemical Warfare in Vietnam (by Fred A. Wilcox, introduction by Chomsky). New York: Seven Stories Press. ISBN 978-1-60980-138-0.
- (2011) Power and Terror: Conflict, Hegemony, and the Rule of Force. Boulder: Paradigm Publishers.
- (2011) How the World Works. Berkeley: Soft Skull Press. (Compilation of What Uncle Sam Really Wants; The Prosperous Few and the Restless Many; Secrets, Lies and Democracy; and The Common Good.)
- (2011) 9-11: Was There An Alternative?. New York: Seven Stories Press. ISBN 978-1-60980-343-8.
- (2011) A New Generation Draws the Line: Humanitarian Intervention and the "Responsibility to Protect" Today (expanded edition). Boulder: Paradigm Publishers.
- (2012) Making the Future: Occupations, Interventions, Empire and Resistance. City Lights Publishers. ISBN 978-0-87286-537-2
- (2012) Occupy. (Occupied Media Pamphlet Series). New York, Zuccotti Park Press. ISBN 978-1-884519-01-7
- (2012) Ilusionistas. Madrid: Irreverentes, 2012. ISBN 978-84-15353-46-1
- (2013) Power Systems: Conversations on Global Democratic Uprisings and the New Challenges to U.S. Empire. Metropolitan Books. ISBN 978-0-8050-9615-6
- (2013) Occupy: Reflections on Class War, Rebellion and Solidarity. Zuccotti Park Press. ISBN 978-1-884519-25-3
- (2013) Nuclear War and Environmental Catastrophe. New York: Seven Stories Press. ISBN 978-1-60980-454-1.
- (2013) On Anarchism. New Press. ISBN 978-1-59558-910-1
- (2013) with Andre Vltchek. On Western Terrorism: From Hiroshima to Drone Warfare. Pluto Press. ISBN 978-0-7453-3387-8
- (2014) Masters of Mankind: Essays and Lectures, 1969-2013. Haymarket Books. ISBN 978-1-60846-363-3
- (2014) Democracy and Power: the Delhi Lectures. Open Book Publishers. ISBN 978-1-78374-092-5
- (2015) Because We Say So. City Lights Open Media. ISBN 978-0-87286-657-7
- (2015) On Palestine. (with Ilan Pappé). Haymarket Books ISBN 978-1-60846-470-8
- (2016) Who Rules the World? Henry Holt and Co. ISBN 978-1-62779-381-0
- (2017) Requiem for the American Dream: The 10 Principles of Concentration of Wealth & Power. New York: Seven Stories Press. ISBN 978-1-60980-736-8.
- (2017) Optimism over Despair: On Capitalism, Empire, and Social Change (with C.J. Polychroniou). Penguin Press. ISBN 978-0-241-98197-9
- (2017) Global Discontents: Conversations on the Rising Threats to Democracy (American Empire Project) (with David Barsamian). Penguin Press. ISBN 978-1-250-14618-2
- (2018) Yugoslavia: Peace, War, and Dissolution (edited by Davor Džalto). PM Press. ISBN 978-1-62963-442-5
- (2019) Internationalism or Extinction. Routledge. ISBN 978-0-367-43058-0
- (2020) Climate Crisis and the Global Green New Deal: The Political Economy of Saving the Planet (with Robert Pollin) Verso Books. ISBN 978-1-78873-985-6
- (2020) Chomsky for Activists (with Charles Derber, Suren Moodliar, Paul Shannon) Routledge, ISBN 978-0-367-54339-6
- (2021) Consequences of Capitalism: Manufacturing Discontent and Resistance (with Marv Waterstone) Haymarket Books. ISBN 978-1-64259-263-4
- (2021) The Precipice: Neoliberalism, the Pandemic and Urgent Need for Radical Change (with C. J. Polychroniou) Haymarket Books. ISBN 978-1-64259-458-4 (paperback), ISBN 978-1-64259-479-9 (e-book), ISBN 978-1-64259-500-0 (hardback)
- (2022) The Withdrawal: Iraq, Libya, Afghanistan, and the Fragility of U.S. Power (with Vijay Prashad) The New Press. ISBN 978-1-62097-760-6
- (2022) Notes on Resistance (interviews by David Barsamian) Haymarket Books, ISBN 978-1-64259-698-4
- (2023) Illegitimate Authority, Facing the Challenges of Our Time (with C. J. Polychroniou). Penguin Press. ISBN 978-0-241-62994-9
- (2024) On Cuba: Reflections on 70 Years of Revolution and Struggle (with Vijay Prashad). The New Press. ISBN 978-1-620-97857-3
- (2024) A Livable Future is Possible: Confronting the Threats to Our Survival (interviews with C. J. Polychroniou). Haymarket Books. ISBN 979-8-88890-306-3
- (2025) The Myth of American Idealism: How U.S. Foreign Policy Endangers the World (with Nathan J. Robinson). Penguin Press. ISBN 978-0-593-65632-7

== Books on Chomsky ==
=== Biographies and general introductions ===
- Allott, Nick; Knight, Chris; Smith, Neil (2019). The Responsibility of Intellectuals - Reflections by Noam Chomsky and Others after 50 years (PDF). London: UCL Press (Open Access). ISBN 978-1-78735-551-4.
- Knight, Chris (2016). Decoding Chomsky: Science and Revolutionary Politics. Boston: Yale University Press. ISBN 978-0-300-22146-6.
- Smith, Neil; Allott, Nicholas (2016). Chomsky: Ideas and Ideals (3rd ed.). Cambridge: Cambridge University Press. ISBN 978-1-107-44267-2.
- McGilvray, James (2013). Chomsky: Language, Mind and Politics (2nd ed.). Cambridge: Polity Press. ISBN 978-1-86189-269-0.
- Collins, John (2008). Chomsky: A Guide for the Perplexed. London: Continuum. ISBN 978-0-8264-8663-9.
- Cook, Vivian; Newson, Mark (2007). Chomsky's Universal Grammar: An Introduction (3rd ed.). Oxford: Blackwell Publishing. ISBN 978-1-4501-1186-7.
- Barsky, Robert F. (2007). The Chomsky Effect: A Radical Works Beyond the Ivory Tower. Cambridge: MIT Press. ISBN 978-0-262-02624-6. Archived from the original on 2008-05-14.
- Sperlich, Wolfgang B. (2006). Noam Chomsky. London: Reaktion Books. ISBN 1-86189-269-1.
- McGilvray, James, ed. (2005). The Cambridge Companion to Chomsky. Cambridge University Press. ISBN 978-0-521-78431-3.
- Barsky, Robert (1997). Noam Chomsky: A Life of Dissent. Cambridge: MIT Press. ISBN 0-262-52255-1.
- Rai, Milan (1995). Chomsky's Politics. London: Verso. ISBN 978-1-85984-011-5.
- Lyons, John (1970). Noam Chomsky (Modern Masters). New York: Viking Press. ISBN 0-670-01911-9.

== Interviews ==
By Amy Goodman

- Democracy Now! November 3, 2018 Noam Chomsky: Members of Migrant Caravan Are Fleeing from Misery & Horrors Created by the U.S.
- Democracy Now! March 02, 2015: Noam Chomsky: After Dangerous Proxy War, Keeping Ukraine Neutral Offers Path to Peace with Russia
- Democracy Now! January 13, 2014: Noam on the Legacy of Ariel Sharon: Not Speaking Ill of the Dead "Impose a Vow of Silence"
- Democracy Now! September 11, 2013 Chomsky Instead of "Illegal" Threat to Syria, U.S. Should Chemical Weapons Ban on All Nations
- Democracy Now! September 13, 2011: "Noam Chomsky on the 9/11 Decade and the Assassination of Osama bin Laden: Was There an Alternative?"
- Democracy Now! February 2, 2011: Noam Chomsky: "This is the Most Remarkable Regional Uprising that I Can Remember"
- Democracy Now! April 3, 2009: US Expansion of Afghan Occupation, the Uses of NATO, and What Obama Should Do in Israel-Palestine
- Democracy Now! February 26, 2008: Public speech in Massachusetts and interview with Amy Goodman: Noam Chomsky: "Why is Iraq Missing from 2008 Presidential Race?"
- Democracy Now! with Noam Chomsky and Howard Zinn
- Democracy Now! November 27, 2007: on Mideast Peace

By Imagineer Magazine

- Noam Chomsky on Somali and online piracy

By Ubah Bulale (The Armchair Psychologist https://www.armchairpsych.com/)
Noam Chomsky interview
By Maria Hinojosa

- Noam Chomsky on America's Foreign Policy

By Peshawa Muhammed

- Noam Chomsky on The US-Kurdish Relations and the Kurdish Question in Iraq
- Noam Chomsky on Iraq and US Foreign Policy

By Andrew Marr

- The Big Idea

By Big Think

- Noam Chomsky On William Buckley, Iraq, Israel and the Global Power Dynamic

By David Barsamian (from Alternative Radio, published in book form)

- Keeping the Rabble in Line (1994)
- Class Warfare (1996)
- The Common Good (1998)
- Propaganda and the Public Mind (2001)
- Imperial Ambitions: Conversations With Noam Chomsky On The Post-9/11 World (2005)
- What We Say Goes: Conversations on U.S. Power in a Changing World (2007)

By Danilo Mandic (published copyleft by Datanews Editrice, Italy)

- On Globalization, Iraq and Middle East Studies (2005)
- On the NATO Bombing of Yugoslavia (2006)

By Harry Kreisler (host of the TV series "Conversations with History" by UC Berkeley)

- Activism, Anarchism, and Power (March 22, 2002) video

By Chris Steele

- Z Magazine December 1, 2012: Struggles of the Past
- Steele, Chris (December 1, 2013). "Noam Chomsky: America hates its poor". Salon. Archived from the original on December 1, 2013.

By others

- Complete list of interviews on chomsky.info

== Filmography ==
- Manufacturing Consent: Noam Chomsky and the Media, Director: Mark Achbar and Peter Wintonick (1992)
- Rox #56 "Noam Chomsky" (1994)
- Last Party 2000, Director: Rebecca Chaiklin and Donovan Leitch (2001)
- Power and Terror: Noam Chomsky in Our Times, Director: John Junkerman (2002)
- Distorted Morality – America's War On Terror?, Director: John Junkerman (2003)
- Noam Chomsky: Rebel Without a Pause (TV), Director: Will Pascoe (2003)
- The Corporation, Directors: Mark Achbar and Jennifer Abbott; Writer: Joel Bakan (2003)
- Peace, Propaganda & the Promised Land, Directors: Sut Jhally and Bathsheba Ratzkoff (2004)
- On Power, Dissent and Racism: A discussion with Noam Chomsky, Journalist: Nicolas Rossier; Producers: Eli Choukri, Baraka Productions (2004)
- Chomsky was interviewed in the BBC documentary film The Power of Nightmares (2004)
- Lake of Fire, Director: Tony Kaye (2006)
- American Feud: A History of Conservatives and Liberals, Director: Richard Hall (2008)
- Chomsky & Cie, Director: Olivier Azam (out in 2008)
- An Inconvenient Tax, Director: Christopher P. Marshall (out in 2009)
- The Money Fix, Director: Alan Rosenblith (2009)
- Pax Americana and the Weaponization of Space, Director: Denis Delestrac (2010)
- Article 12: Waking up in a surveillance society, Director: Juan Manuel Biaiñ (2010)
- In 2012, Chomsky performed a deadpan cameo role in MIT Gangnam Style, a parody of the Gangnam Style music video. Also known informally as "Chomsky Style"; the video was described as the "Best Gangnam Style Parody Yet" by The Huffington Post and it became a multi-million viewed "most popular" video on YouTube in its own right. (video link)
- Chomsky was interviewed in Scott Noble's documentary film The Power Principle (2012)
- Is the Man Who Is Tall Happy?, Director: Michel Gondry (2013)
- We Are Many, Director: Amir Amirani (2014)
- Chomsky was interviewed in Boris Malagurski's documentary film The Weight of Chains 2 (2014)
- Requiem for the American Dream, a (2015) documentary features discourse and reflection with Noam Chomsky directed by Peter D. Hutchison, Kelly Nyks, and Jared P. Scott
- notes to eternity, a (2016) documentary featuring aspects of Chomsky's life and work in relation to the Israel-Palestine conflict, directed by Sarah Cordery
- The Brainwashing of My Dad (2016)
- PIIGS (2017)
