= Understanding Power =

Collection of talks given by Noam Chomsky

Understanding Power: The Indispensable Chomsky
- Author: Noam Chomsky
- Language: English
- Subject: Power (social and political); hegemony
- Published: February 1, 2002
- Publisher: The New Press
- Publication place: United States
- Media type: Print
- Pages: 416
- ISBN: 978-1-56584-703-3
- OCLC: 46936001
- LC Class: P85.C47 U5 2002

Understanding Power: The Indispensable Chomsky, published in 2002, is a collection of previously unpublished transcripts of seminars, talks, and question-and-answer sessions conducted by Noam Chomsky from 1989 to 1999.

The transcripts were compiled and edited by Peter R. Mitchell and John Schoeffel. Mitchell and Schoeffel are public defenders in New York.

== Content ==
The book's ten chapters draw on discussions at various speaking engagements in the United States and Canada.

1. "Weekend Teach-In: Opening Session" (Rowe, Massachusetts, 15–16 April 1989)
2. "Teach-In: Over Coffee" (Rowe, Massachusetts, 15–16 April 1989)
3. "Teach-In: Evening" (Rowe, Massachusetts, 15–16 April 1989)
4. "Colloquy" (Fort Collins, Colorado, 10 April 1990)
5. "Ruling the World" (New York, Massachusetts, Maryland, Colorado, Illinois, and Ontario in 1990 and 1993–96)
6. "Community Activists" (British Columbia, Massachusetts, Illinois, Maryland, and Wyoming in 1989 and 1993–96)
7. "Intellectuals and Social Change" (Woods Hole and Rowe, Massachusetts in 1989 and 1993–94)
8. "Popular Struggle" (Massachusetts, Maryland, Ontario, California, and Wyoming in 1989 and 1993–96)
9. "Movement Organizing" (Woods Hole, Massachusetts in 1993 and 1996)
10. "Turning Point" (Illinois, New Jersey, Massachusetts, New York, and Maryland in 1994–96 and 1999)

== Reception ==
Yannick Vanderborght, writing in the Review of Radical Political Economics, called Understanding Power "a stimulating read", and praised Chomsky's extensive factual knowledge. He said that Chomsky demonstrates "how [what is seen as] 'common sense' can be transcended through the careful exploration of neglected sources, the detailed examination of unrevealed facts, or the informed comparison of forgotten events", but criticized as anti-intellectual Chomsky's assertions that political problems are in reality simple, and warned that "the oral style may arouse suspicions that radicalism necessarily implies unsubtle and unbalanced arguments".

Publishers Weekly said that the book provides "a useful and wide-ranging introduction to [Chomsky's] analysis of power and media", and said: "The discussions – a format that allows Chomsky to present his views in a conversational, accessible style – confirm his wide-ranging engagement with world affairs."

Current Affairs editor Nathan J. Robinson described the book as "rich with insight" and "the best available introduction" to Chomsky's thinking, and named it first among the books that had influenced his own politics.

== See also ==
- Deterring Democracy (1991)
- Manufacturing Consent: The Political Economy of the Mass Media (1988)
- Noam Chomsky bibliography
- Noam Chomsky's political views
