= Who Rules the World =

Who Rules the World may refer to:

- Who Rules the World (TV series)
- Who Rules the World, a book by Noam Chomsky
