= The Sound Pattern of English =

1968 book by Noam Chomsky and Morris Halle

- First edition cover
- Authors: Noam Chomsky; Morris Halle
- Language: English
- Subject: Phonology
- Publisher: Harper & Row
- Publication date: 1968
- Publication place: United States
- Pages: 470

The Sound Pattern of English (SPE) is a work on phonology by linguists Noam Chomsky and Morris Halle, originally published in 1968. As the first exposition of the framework of generative phonology, it was the authoritative text of the field for most phonologists in the decade following its publication. In SPE, Chomsky and Halle present a view of phonology as a component of generative grammar, alongside syntax and semantics.

A language's phonology is said to consist of a series of computations, termed phonological rules. The phonological rules relate the output of the syntactic component—the "underlying representation"—to a "surface" (or "phonetic") representation, which in turn serves as the input to the articulatory mechanisms that lead to speech. Phonological rules operate on a set of universal phonological categories termed distinctive features, which are the minimal building blocks of phonological representation.

In the United States, SPE revolutionized the field of phonology, replacing the previously dominant structuralist approaches with what is now termed classical generative phonology. It abandoned the structuralist notion of the "taxonomic" phoneme, and introduced serial computation with phonological rules. Few of SPE's specific conclusions have survived constant criticism and revision, but the book has remained influential. Much of the work in phonology after the publication of SPE has been dedicated to revising or defending the claims made in SPE.

== Authors ==
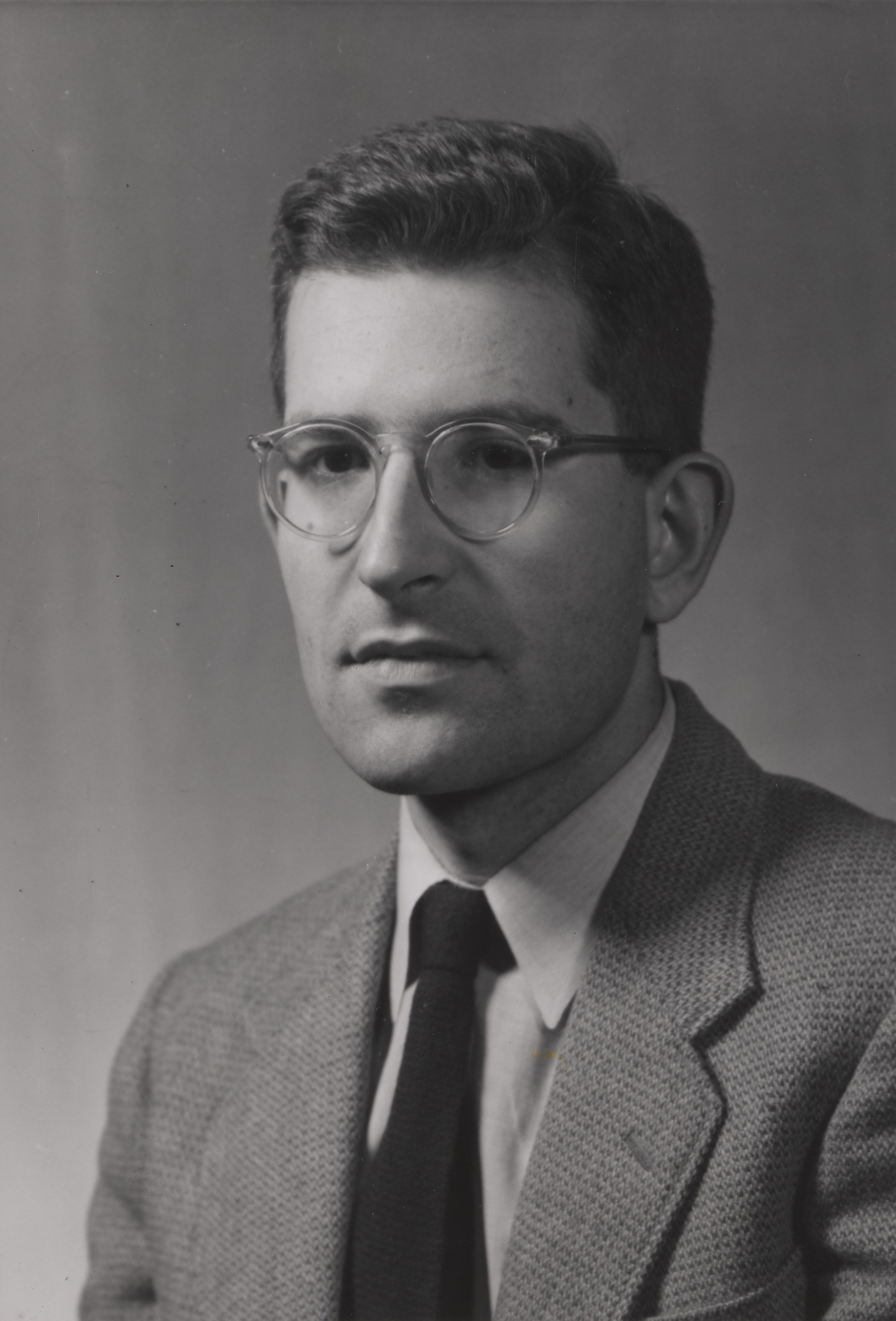
Noam Chomsky in 1961

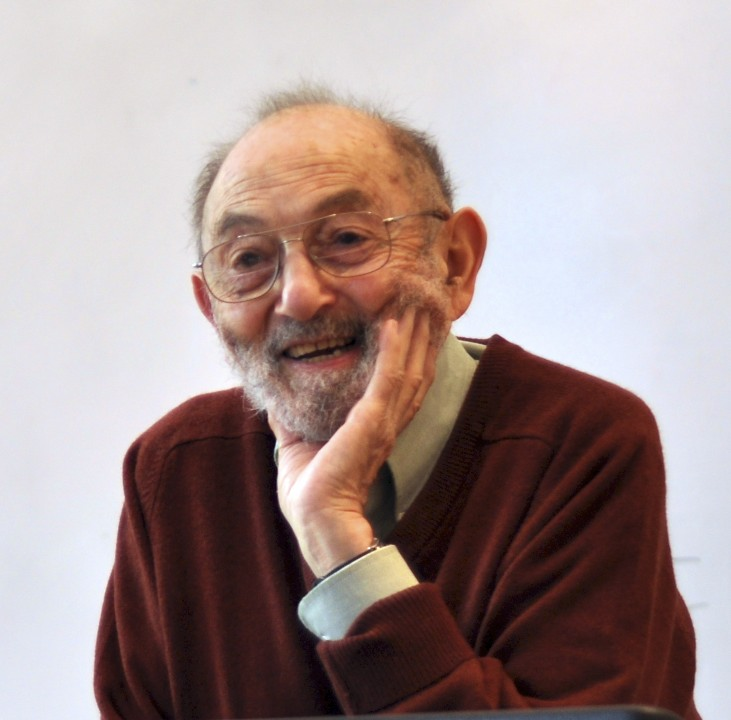
Morris Halle in 2011

Noam Chomsky was born in Philadelphia, Pennsylvania in 1928 to the Hebrew philologist William Chomsky. As an undergraduate at the University of Pennsylvania, Chomsky met Zellig Harris, who introduced him to American structural linguistics. At Harris's suggestion, Chomsky started to work on a grammar of Hebrew. Chomsky worked in "total isolation" for several years, eventually producing his 1949 undergraduate thesis and 1951 masters thesis "Morphophonemics of Modern Hebrew". In 1951, Chomsky was appointed junior fellow at Harvard, where he met and befriended Halle, who was at the time a graduate student at Harvard.

Morris Halle was born in Liepāja, Latvia, in 1923 and emigrated to the United States in 1940. After obtaining a linguistics degree from the University of Chicago, Halle studied under the Russian Prague school linguist Roman Jakobson. While at Harvard, Halle was also hired by the MIT Research Laboratory of Electronics; he collaborated with Jakobson and Gunnar Fant to formulate a distinctive feature system in the 1952 work Preliminaries to Speech Analysis, earning a reputation as an acoustic phonetician.

== Writing and publication ==
By the summer of 1953, Chomsky and Halle had become disillusioned with the procedures of structural linguistics and started their collaboration in phonology in Paris, based on the notational system in Chomsky's Morphophonemics of Modern Hebrew. In 1955, Chomsky received his PhD from the University of Pennsylvania for a chapter of his monograph The Logical Structure of Linguistic Theory (LSLT), and began working at MIT as assistant professor. In LSLT, SPE was already referenced as "Halle and Chomsky, 'Evaluation Procedures in Linguistics', in preparation". Part of that work was presented in the 1959 Fourth Texas Conference. Also in 1959, Halle published The Sound Pattern of Russian, the first major work in generative phonology. After the MIT doctoral program in linguistics was established in 1961, other scholars and students associated with the program also contributed to the body of research presented in SPE.

SPE was first published by Harper & Row in 1968, although pre-publication manuscripts had already been circulating since 1964. SPE incorporates material from the 1956 paper "On Accent and Juncture in English", jointly authored by Chomsky, Halle, and Fred Lukoff, and the 1967 paper "Some General Properties of Phonological Rules" authored by Chomsky alone. The book is titled The Sound Pattern of English in reference to American linguist Edward Sapir's earlier paper "Sound Patterns in Language".

Stephen R. Anderson writes that apart from its theoretical significance, SPE's publication also had a symbolic significance: "it marked the end of an era in which the major works of generative linguistics (in syntax as well as in phonology) were circulated primarily in samizdat form among a small circle of insiders, with those not on the necessary mailing lists confined to secondhand reports and rumors for their information on the shape of theoretical developments."

In 1973, a partial French language translation of SPE was published, containing only portions from chapters 1, 2, 7, 8, and 9. It was titled Principes de phonologie générative, in reference to Russian linguist Nikolai Trubetzkoy's 1939 book Grundzüge der Phonologie 'Principles of Phonology'. Other partial translations of SPE were published in German in 1975, and Spanish in 1979. In 1991, the book was republished by MIT Press. In 2025, Commercial Press published a full Mandarin Chinese translation of SPE, titled Yīngyǔ Yīnxì (英语音系).

== Overview ==
SPE consists of nine chapters, organized into four self-contained parts. Part I, "General Survey", contains the first two chapters, outlining the background assumptions of the book and its major conclusions. In Part II, "English phonology", which consists of chapters 3, 4, and 5, Chomsky and Halle apply the generative framework to specific aspects of English phonology in detail, concluding chapter five by enumerating a list of phonological rules specific to English. Part III, "History", contains only chapter 6, and focuses on the history of English vowels. Part IV, "Phonological theory", which consists of the final three chapters, develops and formalizes the theory used throughout the book, focusing on universal grammar rather than English.

=== General framework ===
In SPE, Chomsky and Halle provide an introduction to the architecture of generative grammar, conceiving of language as a specialized, autonomous module in the sense of cognitive science. Language is further internally divided into constituent modules of phonology, semantics, and syntax. The phonological component consists of a sequence of phonological rules, which translate the syntactic structure at the output of the syntactic component into a phonetic representation, which can in turn be translated into a physical speech signal by the sensorimotor system. Chomsky and Halle require phonological rules to be stated fully explicitly and unambiguously, comparing phonological rules to "instructions that might be given to a mindless robot, incapable of exercising any judgment or imagination in their application". When multiple sets of rules can account for the same data, the formally simplest one is preferred. Formal simplicity is taken as a theory-internal measure, which linguists must devise for a given linguistic theory. This "evaluation measure" based on formal simplicity is more elaborately justified in Chomsky's earlier work Logical Structure of Linguistic Theory.

=== Phonological rules ===
Chomsky and Halle formalize phonological rules as $A \rightarrow B / X \_\_ Y$,

where A and B represent single units of the phonological system (or the null element); the arrow stands for "is actualized as"; the diagonal line means "in the context"; and X and Y represent, respectively, the left- and right-hand environments in which A appears.

Within a language, phonological rules must be strictly ordered in relation to each other: if a language has two rules, then it must also determine which one applies before the other.

=== Distinctive features ===
In the theory of SPE, distinctive features are the minimal units of phonological representation: they distinguish words from each other in the lexicon and are the terms in which phonological rules are expressed. Chomsky and Halle assume the set of distinctive features to be universal, reflecting all the phonetic properties that are linguistically manipulable. They treat speech sounds as bundles of distinctive features, which are in turn arranged sequentially in the speech signal. Alphabetic symbols are used only as abbreviatory devices for bundles of distinctive features. For example, the symbol /i/ is a shorthand for the following feature matrix:

$$\begin{bmatrix}
+\text{segment} \\
+\text{vocalic} \\
-\text{consonantal} \\
+\text{high} \\
-\text{low} \\
-\text{back} \\
-\text{round} \\
-\text{tense} \\
\end{bmatrix}$$

Chomsky and Halle's feature system is largely informed by the earlier distinctive feature system devised by Jakobson, Fant, and Halle in their Preliminaries to Speech Analysis (PSA), but there are differences. Chomsky and Halle distinguish between features in their "classificatory" and "phonetic" functions: features in their "classificatory" functions distinguish words from each other in the lexicon, and are strictly binary, taking as values either + (plus) or − (minus); in their "phonetic" functions, distinctive features receive interpretation as "instructions to the physical articulatory system" and take multiple values, represented by integers (0, 1, 2, ...). Another innovation from the PSA feature system is the definition of features in articulatory terms rather than in acoustic terms. Chomsky and Halle define a neutral position for the major articulators, in which the velum is raised and shuts off the nasal cavity, the vocal folds are positioned to allow spontaneous voicing, and the tongue body is positioned approximately as in the vowel [ɛ] in English bed.

In SPE, distinctive features are the units by which the formal complexity of a phonological rule is measured: all else being equal, the evaluation measure assigns the highest value to rules stated in the fewest feature specifications, which are considered the simplest. Distinctive features reflect natural classes, and using fewer features defines a broader natural class, and Chomsky and Halle consider more general rules with broader applicable environments to capture more natural phonological generalizations than those with limited, circumscribed environments.

=== English vowels ===
The discussion of English phonology in SPE is centered around a process referred to as the Vowel Shift, in which tense (or diphthongal) vowels systematically alternate with their lax (or short) counterparts. These alternations are the outcomes of sound change during the late Middle English period (c. 15th century). Examples involving front vowels are given below:

Tense	Lax
divíne [aj]	divínity [ɪ]
seréne [ij]	serénity [ɛ]
profáne [ej]	profánity [æ]

Chomsky and Halle propose that the tense diphthongs in these alternations are underlyingly long vowels, which are changed into diphthongs by phonological rule. They suggest that the Velar Softening rule, which produces alternations such as electric (with [k]) and electricity (with [s]), is ordered before the Vowel Shift rule. For instance, in a word like criticize, the Velar Softening rule seemingly applies before a back vowel [aj], but if the suffix -ize is underlyingly /īz/, and Velar Softening applies before diphthongization, then it is possible to preserve the formally simple generalization that Velar Softening applies before front vowels.

=== Markedness ===
Chomsky and Halle begin the final chapter of SPE, subtitled "prologue and epilogue", by stating that "the entire discussion in this book suffers from a fundamental theoretical inadequacy". Throughout the previous eight chapters, SPE had adopted a purely formal approach to phonology, in which formal notational length of a rule is said to directly reflect its degree of naturalness. Chomsky and Halle conclude that this approach fails to account for the "intrinsic value of features" and leads to the absurd conclusion that any feature in a rule could be replaced by any other feature or be inverted (by interchanging all '+' values with '−' values) without affecting the rule's naturalness. For instance, the SPE feature system would consider a rule that palatalizes velar consonants before front vowels to be as natural as one that palatalizes them before back vowels.

To obviate this problem, Chomsky and Halle propose a set of universal "marking conventions", defining the marked and unmarked values of phonological features dependent on their context. For example, [+voice] is marked in obstruents as opposed to [–voice], and mid vowels are marked compared to high vowels and low vowels. Then, the evaluation measure is changed to determine formal complexity on the basis of marked and unmarked specifications, rather than plus and minus specifications; the difference is that a plus specification contributed the same amount of formal complexity as a corresponding minus specification, but an unmarked specification contributes no additional complexity compared to the marked specification.

== Reception ==
Shortly after its publication, the generative framework of SPE became the dominant framework in the field of phonology, serving as the basis of the vast majority of work produced by younger linguists. Before SPE, criticisms of generative phonology mostly came from the perspective of structuralism, but since SPE's publication, objections have mainly come from within the generative view of language established by Chomsky and Halle.

Four important reviews of SPE and fourteen other papers about its contents were anthologized as part of the 1975 volume Essays on the Sound Pattern of English. In the editorial introductions, Belgian linguist Didier Goyvaerts and British linguist Geoffrey Pullum wrote that SPE was "the most widely discussed single work in linguistics today [in 1975]" and that no other work had triggered as much discussion as SPE had to warrant a critical anthology. The editors point out that despite the theoretical diversity of the four reviewers, the reviews were "almost completely unanimous" about the importance and value of SPE, particularly in making explicit, falsifiable claims. In one review, American linguist James E. Hoard characterized SPE as "a milestone in the history of phonology", writing that SPE established a scientific paradigm that "permits, perhaps for the first time, serious scientific inquiry in phonology". In another review, American linguist James McCawley praised the quality of argumentation in SPE as "unprecedented", adding that the investigations of the book "lead one deeper into the inner workings of the phonology of a language than any previous work". Despite rejecting many of SPE's specific conclusions, McCawley emphasized its methodological value, writing that his alternative proposals "could not even have been stated without the stimulation provided by SPE".

Some linguists reviewed SPE less favorably. In response to McCawley's review, American linguist Theodore Lightner wrote that SPE was "not ready for publication" and that it "fails to make a contribution either to the analysis of English or to the study of theoretical linguistics". German linguist Klaus Kohler concluded his own review of SPE by reaffirming its methodological clarity, while also describing it as an example of "how phonology should not be done if it is to be useful and applicable".

=== Historiographical assessment ===
SPE remains highly regarded in the historiography of linguistics. In the 2022 Oxford History of Phonology, American phonologist Michael Kenstowicz writes that "in the fifty or so years since its publication, no single work has come close to SPE's combination of theoretical originality and descriptive insight." In 2000, French linguist Pierre Encrevé described SPE as "the key book of 20th century phonology", only rivaled by the 1939 Grundzüge der Phonologie by Russian linguist Nikolai Trubetzkoy.

Like Chomsky's earlier work of Syntactic Structures, SPE is commonly described as having incited a scientific revolution in the field of phonology, in the sense proposed by philosopher Thomas Kuhn. In America, it replaced the previous dominant paradigm of "neo-Bloomfieldian" structural linguists championed by figures like Charles Hockett (born 1916) and Bernard Bloch (born 1907). Linguist Stephen O. Murray argues that SPE's dismissal of phonemics was uniquely revolutionary and "more provocative than anything Chomsky could have said about syntax or behaviorism vs. mentalism"; Murray writes that while the phoneme was integral to the earlier generation of linguists, they paid relatively little attention to syntax, and thus "if [Syntactic Structures] made a revolution, the overthrown regime failed to realize it."

== Subsequent developments ==
After American involvement in the Vietnam War escalated in the 1960s, Chomsky increasingly involved himself in politics and stepped away from his linguistic interests with the exception of syntax, which he found most important. When asked about his abandonment of phonology after SPE in an interview, Chomsky added that he did not enjoy specific aspects of his work, including phonetics, which he found to be "too close to the world".

Halle continued to be active in the field of phonology after SPE, including making revisions to certain aspects of SPE. In 1998, for the thirtieth anniversary of SPE's publication, Halle published a paper reflecting upon the history of SPE and revising the account of the English stress system using the formal mechanisms of metrical phonology, which had developed from the SPE tradition under younger phonologists, including Mark Liberman, Alan Prince, and William Idsardi.

In contrast to subsequent developments in generative phonology in the 1970s and 1980s, the framework of SPE is referred to as classical generative phonology (CGP). In contrast to Optimality Theory, which emerged as the dominant paradigm in generative phonology in the 1990s, SPE is often taken as the representative of rule-based phonology (RBP), since Optimality Theory uses constraints where SPE uses rules.
