= Political positions of Noam Chomsky =

Views of the linguist on organized society

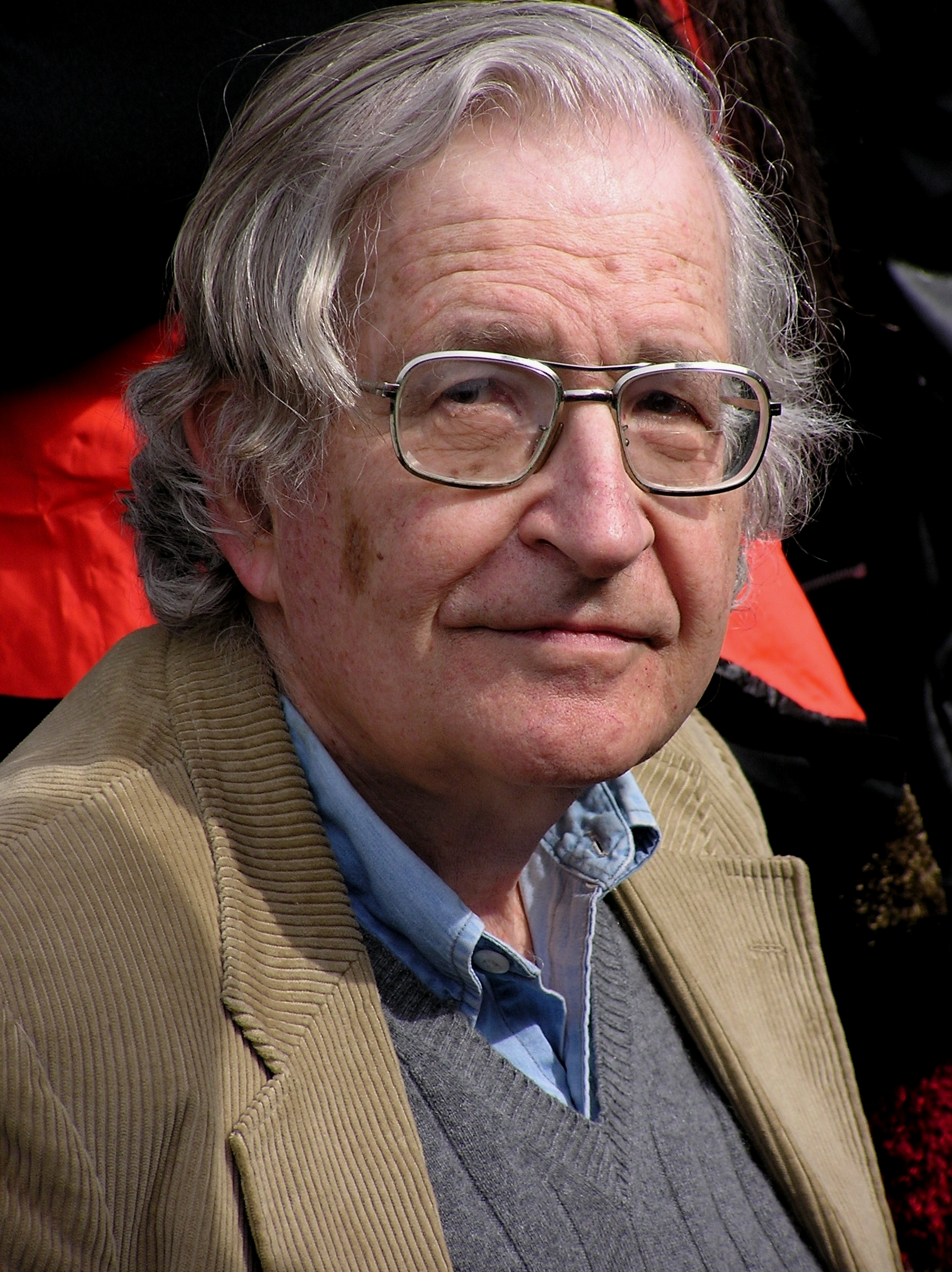
Noam Chomsky at an antiwar rally in Vancouver, 2004

Noam Chomsky (born December 7, 1928) is an intellectual, political activist, and critic of the foreign policy of the United States and other governments. Chomsky describes himself as an anarcho-syndicalist and libertarian socialist, and is considered to be a key intellectual figure within the left wing of politics of the United States.

== Political views ==
Chomsky is often described as one of the best-known figures of the American Left, although he doesn't agree with the usage of the term. He has described himself as a "fellow traveller" to the anarchist tradition, and refers to himself as a libertarian socialist, a political philosophy he summarizes as challenging all forms of authority and attempting to eliminate them if they are unjustified for which the burden of proof is solely upon those who attempt to exert power. He identifies with the labor-oriented anarcho-syndicalist current of anarchism in particular cases, and is a member of the Industrial Workers of the World. He also exhibits some favor for the libertarian socialist vision of participatory economics, himself being a member of the Interim Committee for the International Organization for a Participatory Society.

He believes that libertarian socialist values exemplify the rational and morally consistent extension of original unreconstructed classical liberal and radical humanist ideas in an industrial context.

Chomsky is considered "one of the most influential left-wing critics of American foreign policy" by the Dictionary of Modern American Philosophers.

== Views on ideologies and values ==
=== Freedom of speech ===
Chomsky has taken strong stands against censorship and for freedom of speech, even for views he personally condemns. He has stated that "with regard to freedom of speech there are basically two positions: you defend it vigorously for views you hate, or you reject it and prefer Stalinist/fascist standards".

=== Globalization ===
Chomsky made early efforts to critically analyze globalization. He summarized the process with the phrase "old wine, new bottles", maintaining that the motive of the elites is the same as always: they seek to isolate the general population from important decision-making processes, the difference being that the centers of power are now transnational corporations and supranational banks. Chomsky argues that transnational corporate power is "developing its own governing institutions" reflective of their global reach.

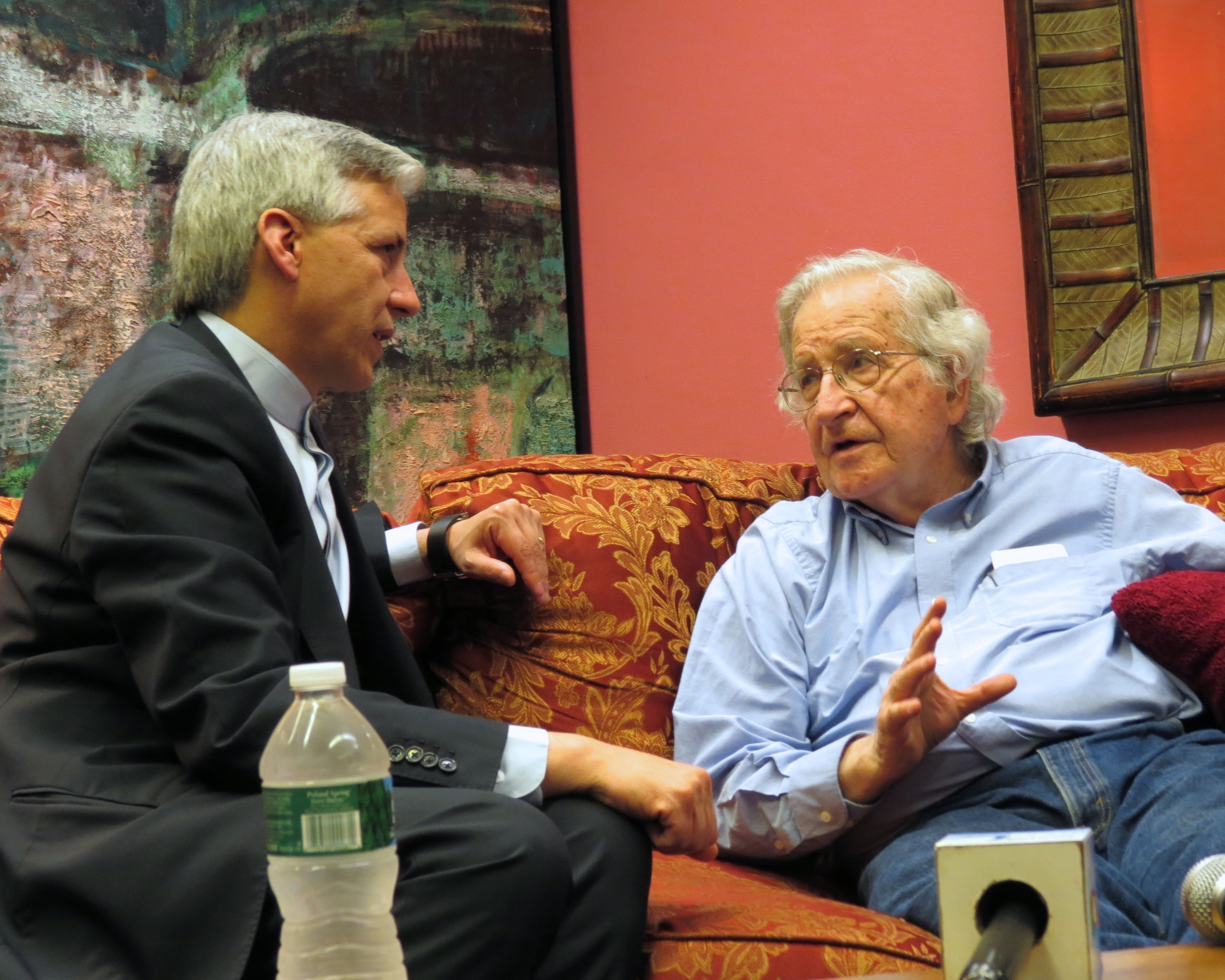
Chomsky speaking with Bolivian Vice President Álvaro García Linera

According to Chomsky, a primary ploy has been the co-opting of the global economic institutions established at the end of World War II, the International Monetary Fund (IMF) and the World Bank, which have increasingly adhered to the "Washington Consensus", requiring developing countries to adhere to limits on spending and make structural adjustments that often involve cutbacks in social and welfare programs. IMF aid and loans are normally contingent upon such reforms. Chomsky claims that the construction of global institutions and agreements such as the World Trade Organization, the General Agreement on Tariffs and Trade (GATT), the North American Free Trade Agreement (NAFTA), and the Multilateral Agreement on Investment constitute new ways of securing elite privileges while undermining democracy. Chomsky believes that these austere and neoliberal measures ensure that poorer countries merely fulfill a service role by providing cheap labor, raw materials and investment opportunities for the developed world. This means that corporations can threaten to relocate to poorer countries, and Chomsky sees this as a powerful weapon to keep workers in richer countries in line.

Chomsky takes issue with the terms used in discourse on globalization, beginning with the term "globalization" itself, which he maintains refers to a corporate-sponsored economic integration rather than being a general term for things becoming international. He dislikes the term anti-globalization being used to describe what he regards as a movement for globalization of social and environmental justice. Chomsky understands what is popularly called "free trade" as a "mixture of liberalization and protection designed by the principal architects of policy in the service of their interests, which happen to be whatever they are in any particular period." In his writings, Chomsky has drawn attention to globalization resistance movements. He described Zapatista defiance of NAFTA in his essay "The Zapatista Uprising." He also criticized the Multilateral Agreement on Investment, and reported on the activist efforts that led to its defeat. Chomsky's voice was an important part of the critics who provided the theoretical backbone for the disparate groups who united for the demonstrations against the World Trade Organization in Seattle in November 1999.

=== Socialism and communism ===
Noam Chomsky considers libertarian socialism "the proper and natural extension" of classical liberalism "into the era of advanced industrial society". Chomsky sees libertarian socialist ideas as the descendants of the classical liberal ideas of the Age of Enlightenment, arguing that his ideological position revolves around "nourishing the libertarian and creative character of the human being". Chomsky envisions an anarcho-syndicalist future with direct worker control of the means of production and government by workers' councils which would select representatives to meet together at general assemblies. In Jefferson's words, the point of this self-governance is to make each citizen "a direct participator in the government of affairs". Chomsky believes that there will be no need for political parties. Chomsky believes individuals can gain job satisfaction and a sense of fulfilment and purpose by controlling their productive life. Chomsky argues that unpleasant and unpopular jobs could be fully automated, carried out by specially remunerated workers, or shared among everyone.

Chomsky is deeply critical of what he calls the "corporate state capitalism" that he believes is practiced by the United States and other Western states. He supports many of Mikhail Bakunin's anarchist (or libertarian socialist) ideas. Chomsky has identified Bakunin's comments regarding the totalitarian state as predictions for the brutal Soviet police state that would come in essays like "The Soviet Union Versus Socialism". He has also defined Soviet communism as another form of "state capitalism", particularly because any socialism worthy of the name requires authentic democratic control of production and resources as well as public ownership. He has said that the collapse of the Soviet Union should be regarded "as a small victory for socialism, not only because of the fall of one of the most anti-socialist states in the world, where working people had fewer rights than in the West, but also because it freed the term 'socialism' from the burden of being associated in the propaganda systems of East and West with Soviet tyranny — for the East, in order to benefit from the aura of authentic socialism, for the West, in order to demonize the concept." Before the collapse of the Soviet Union, Chomsky explicitly condemned Soviet imperialism; for example in 1986 during a question/answer following a lecture he gave at Universidad Centroamericana in Nicaragua, when challenged by an audience member about how he could "talk about North American imperialism and Russian imperialism in the same breath", Chomsky responded: "One of the truths about the world is that there are two superpowers, one a huge power which happens to have its boot on your neck, another, a smaller power which happens to have its boot on other people's necks. And I think that anyone in the Third World would be making a grave error if they succumbed to illusions about these matters."

Chomsky was also impressed with socialism as practiced in Vietnam. In a speech given in Hanoi on April 13, 1970, and broadcast by Radio Hanoi the next day, Chomsky spoke of his "admiration for the people of Vietnam who have been able to defend themselves against the ferocious attack, and at the same time take great strides forward toward the socialist society." Chomsky praised the North Vietnamese for their efforts in building material prosperity, social justice, and cultural progress. He also went on to discuss and support the political writing of Lê Duẩn.

In his 1973 essay collection For Reasons of State, Chomsky argues that instead of a capitalist system in which people are "wage slaves" or an authoritarian system in which decisions are made by a centralized committee, a society could function with no paid labor. He argues that a nation's populace should be free to pursue jobs of their choosing. People will be free to do as they like, and the work they voluntarily choose will be both "rewarding in itself" and "socially useful." Society would be run under a system of peaceful anarchism, with no state or other authoritarian institutions. Work that was fundamentally distasteful to all, if any existed, would be distributed equally among everyone.

Chomsky was always critical of the Soviet Union. In a 2016 interview he said that Mao's revolution in China was responsible for "a huge death toll, in the tens of millions" during the Great Leap Forward; but he also gave the revolution credit for saving 100 million lives between 1949 and 1979 through rural health and development programs. In 1960s, Chomsky noted what he considered to be grassroots elements within both Chinese and Vietnamese communism. In December 1967, during a forum in New York, Chomsky responded to criticisms of the Chinese Communist Revolution as follows, "I don't feel that they deserve a blanket condemnation at all. There are many things to object to in any society. But take China, modern China; one also finds many things that are really quite admirable." Chomsky continued: "There are even better examples than China. But I do think that China is an important example of a new society in which very interesting positive things happened at the local level, in which a good deal of the collectivization and communization was really based on mass participation and took place after a level of understanding had been reached in the peasantry that led to this next step." He said of Vietnam: "Although there appears to be a high degree of democratic participation at the village and regional levels, still major planning is highly centralized in the hands of the state authorities."

=== Marxism ===
Chomsky is critical of Marxism's dogmatic strains, and the idea of Marxism itself, but still appreciates Marx's contributions to political thought. Chomsky does not consider Bolshevism "Marxism in practice", but he does recognize that Marx was a complicated figure who had conflicting ideas; while he acknowledges the latent authoritarianism in Marx he also points to the libertarian strains which developed into the council communism of Rosa Luxemburg and Anton Pannekoek. His commitment to libertarian socialism however has led him to characterize himself as an anarchist with radical Marxist leanings.

=== Anarchism ===
In practice Chomsky has tended to emphasize the philosophical tendency of anarchism to criticize all forms of illegitimate authority. He has been reticent about theorizing an anarchist society in detail, although he has outlined its likely value systems and institutional framework in broad terms. According to Chomsky, the variety of anarchism which he favors is:

... a kind of voluntary socialism, that is, as libertarian socialist or anarcho-syndicalist or communist anarchist, in the tradition of, say, Bakunin and Kropotkin and others. They had in mind a highly organized form of society, but a society that was organized on the basis of organic units, organic communities. And generally, they meant by that the workplace and the neighborhood, and from those two basic units there could derive through federal arrangements a highly integrated kind of social organization which might be national or even international in scope. And these decisions could be made over a substantial range, but by delegates who are always part of the organic community from which they come, to which they return, and in which, in fact, they live.

On the question of the government of political and economic institutions, Chomsky has consistently emphasized the importance of grassroots democratic forms. Accordingly, current Anglo-American institutions of representative democracy "would be criticized by an anarchist of this school on two grounds. First of all because there is a monopoly of power centralized in the state, and secondly – and critically – because the representative democracy is limited to the political sphere and in no serious way encroaches on the economic sphere."

Chomsky believes anarchism is a direct descendant of liberalism, further developing the ideals of personal liberty and minimal government of the Enlightenment. He views libertarian socialism thus as the logical conclusion of liberalism, extending its democratic ideals into the economy, making anarchism an inherently socialist philosophy.

=== American libertarianism ===
Noam Chomsky has described libertarianism, as it is understood in the United States, as, "extreme advocation of total tyranny" and "the extreme opposite of what's been called libertarian in every other part of the world since the Enlightenment."

=== Welfare ===
Chomsky is scathing in his opposition to the view that anarchism is inconsistent with support for "welfare state" measures, stating in part that

One can, of course, take the position that we don't care about the problems people face today, and want to think about a possible tomorrow. OK, but then don't pretend to have any interest in human beings and their fate, and stay in the seminar room and intellectual coffee house with other privileged people. Or one can take a much more humane position: I want to work, today, to build a better society for tomorrow – the classical anarchist position, quite different from the slogans in the question. That's exactly right, and it leads directly to support for the people facing problems today: for enforcement of health and safety regulation, provision of national health insurance, support systems for people who need them, etc. That is not a sufficient condition for organizing for a different and better future, but it is a necessary condition. Anything else will receive the well-merited contempt of people who do not have the luxury to disregard the circumstances in which they live, and try to survive.

=== Antisemitism ===
In a 2004 interview with Jennifer Bleyer published in Ugly Planet, issue two and in Heeb, Chomsky engaged in the following exchange:

Q: Let's return to anti-Semitism for a moment. You've written that you don't perceive anti-Semitism as a problem anymore, at least in this country, since its institutional applications and casual manifestations have basically disappeared. Do you still believe that?

I grew up with anti-Semitism in the United States. We were the only Jewish family in a mostly Irish- and German-Catholic neighborhood, which was very anti-Semitic and pretty pro-Nazi. For a young boy in the streets, you got to know what that meant. When my father was first able to get a secondhand car in the late 30s, we drove to the local mountains and passed hotels that said "restricted" meaning "no Jews". That was just part of life. When I got to Harvard in the 1950s, the anti-Semitism was so thick you could cut it with a knife. In fact, one of the reasons MIT is a great university is that people like Norbert Wiener couldn't get jobs at Harvard – it was too anti-Semitic – so they came to the engineering school down the street. That was anti-Semitism. Now, it's a very marginal issue. There is still racism, but it's anti-Arab racism which is extreme. Distinguished Harvard professors write that Palestinians are people who bleed and breed their misery in order to drive the Jews into the sea, and that's considered acceptable. If some distinguished Harvard professor were to write that Jews are people who bleed and breed and advertise their misery in order to drive Palestinians into the desert, the cry of outrage would be enormous. When Jewish intellectuals who are regarded as humanist leaders say that Israel ought to settle the underpopulated Galilee – meaning too many Arabs, not enough Jews – that's considered wonderful. Violent anti-Arab racism is so prevalent that we don't even notice it. That's what we should be worried about. It's in the cinema, advertising, everywhere. On the other hand, anti-Semitism is there, but very marginal.

=== Death penalty ===
Chomsky is a vocal advocate against the use of the death penalty. When asked his opinion on capital punishment in Secrets, Lies, and Democracy, he stated:

It's a crime. I agree with Amnesty International on that one, and indeed with most of the world. The state should have no right to take people's lives.

He has commented on the use of the death penalty in Texas as well as other states. On August 26, 2011, he spoke out against the execution of Steven Woods in Texas.

I think the death penalty is a crime no matter what the circumstances, and it is particularly awful in the Steven Woods case. I strongly oppose the execution of Steven Woods on September 13, 2011.

=== Copyright and patents ===
Chomsky has criticized copyright laws as well as patent laws. On copyright he argued in a 2009 interview:

[T]here are better ways. For example, it should be, in a free democratic society, a sort of responsibility arrived at by democratic decision to maintain adequate support for creative arts as we do for science. If that were done, the artists wouldn't need copyrights to survive.

On patents, he stated:

If that patent regime had existed in the 18th and 19th centuries and even through the early 20th century, the United States and England would not be rich, developed countries. They developed substantially by what we now call piracy.

== Views on institutions ==
=== Criticism of United States government ===
If the Nuremberg laws were applied, then every post-war American president would have been hanged.

— Noam Chomsky (around 1990)

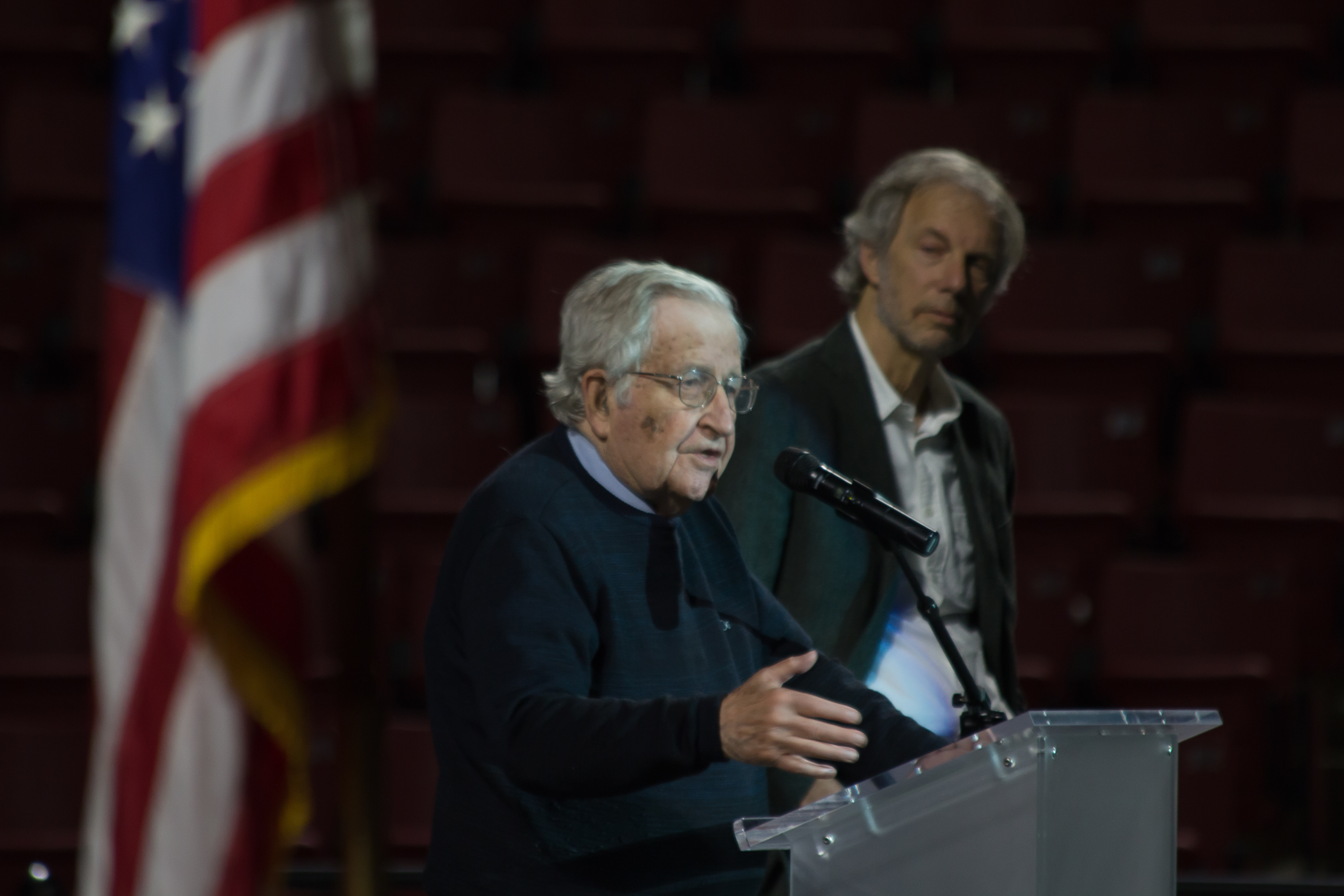
Chomsky cautions against ignoring the threats of climate change and nuclear war in the wake of Donald Trump's election, in a 2017 speech.

Chomsky has been a consistent and outspoken critic of the United States government, and criticism of the foreign policy of the United States has formed the basis of much of his political writing. Chomsky gives reasons for directing his activist efforts to the state of which he is a citizen. He believes that his work can have more impact when directed at his own government, and that he holds a responsibility as a member of a particular country of origin to work to stop that country from committing crimes. He expresses this idea often with a comparison of other countries holding that every country has flexibility to address crimes by unfavored countries, but is always unwilling to deal with their own. Speaking in Nicaragua in 1986, Chomsky was asked "We feel that through what you say and write you are our friend but at the same time you talk about North American imperialism and Russian imperialism in the same breath. I ask you how you can use the same arguments as reactionaries?" to which Chomsky responded,

I have been accused of everything and that therefore includes being a reactionary. From my personal experience there are two countries in which my political writings can basically not appear. One is the U.S. within the mainstream with very rare exceptions. The other is the USSR. I think what we ought to do is to try to understand the truth about the world. And the truth about the world is usually quite unpleasant. My own concern is primarily the terror and violence carried out by my own state, for two reasons. For one thing, because it happens to be the larger component of international violence. But also for a much more important reason than that; namely, I can do something about it. So even if the U.S. was responsible for 2 percent of the violence in the world instead of the majority of it, it would be that 2 percent I would be primarily responsible for. And that is a simple ethical judgment. That is, the ethical value of one's actions depends on their anticipated and predictable consequences. It is very easy to denounce the atrocities of someone else. That has about as much ethical value as denouncing atrocities that took place in the 18th century.

The point is that the useful and significant political actions are those that have consequences for human beings. And those are overwhelmingly the actions which you have some way of influencing and controlling, which mean for me, American actions. But I am also involved in protesting Soviet imperialism, and also explaining its roots in Soviet society. And I think that anyone in the Third World would be making a grave error if they succumbed to illusions about these matters.

He also contends that the United States, as the world's remaining superpower, acts in the same offensive ways as all superpowers. One of the key things superpowers do, Chomsky argues, is try to organize the world according to the interests of their establishment, using military and economic means. Chomsky has repeatedly emphasized that the overall framework of US foreign policy can be explained by the domestic dominance of US business interests and a drive to secure the state capitalist system. Those interests set the political agenda and the economic goals that aim primarily at US economic dominance.

His conclusion is that a consistent part of the United States' foreign policy is based on stemming the "threat of a good example." This 'threat' refers to the possibility that a country could successfully develop outside the US-managed global system, thus presenting a model for other countries, including countries in which the United States has strong economic interests. This, Chomsky says, has prompted the United States to repeatedly intervene to quell "independent development, regardless of ideology" in regions of the world where it has little economic or safety interests. In one of his works, What Uncle Sam Really Wants, Chomsky argues that this particular explanation accounts in part for the United States' interventions in Guatemala, Laos, Nicaragua, and Grenada, countries that pose no military threat to the US and have economic resources that are not important to the US establishment.

Chomsky claims that the US government's Cold War policies were not primarily shaped by anti-Soviet paranoia, but rather toward preserving the United States' ideological and economic dominance in the world. In his book Deterring Democracy he argues that the conventional understanding of the Cold War as a confrontation of two superpowers is an "ideological construct." He insists that to truly understand the Cold War one must examine the underlying motives of the major powers. Those underlying motives can only be discovered by analyzing the domestic politics, especially the goals of the domestic elites in each country:

Putting second order complexities to the side, for the USSR the Cold War has been primarily a war against its satellites, and for the U.S. a war against the Third World. For each, it has served to entrench a particular system of domestic privilege and coercion. The policies pursued within the Cold War framework have been unattractive to the general population, which accepts them only under duress. Throughout history, the standard device to mobilize a reluctant population has been the fear of an evil enemy, dedicated to its destruction. The superpower conflict served the purpose admirably, both for internal needs, as we see in the fevered rhetoric of top planning documents such as NSC 68, and in public propaganda. The Cold War had a functional utility for the superpowers, one reason why it persisted.

Chomsky says the US economic system is primarily a state capitalist system, in which public funds are used to research and develop pioneering technology (the computer, the internet, radar, the jet plane etc.) largely in the form of defense spending, and once developed and mature these technologies are turned over to the corporate sector where civilian uses are developed for private control and profit.

Chomsky often expresses his admiration for the civil liberties enjoyed by US citizens. According to Chomsky, other Western democracies such as France and Canada are less liberal in their defense of controversial speech than the US. However, he does not credit the American government for these freedoms but rather mass social movements in the United States that fought for them. The movements he most often credits are the abolitionist movement, the movements for workers' rights and trade union organization, and the fight for African-American civil rights. Chomsky is often sharply critical of other governments who suppress free speech, most controversially in the Faurisson affair but also of the suppression of free speech in Turkey.

At the fifth annual Edward W. Said Memorial Lecture hosted by the Heyman Center for the Humanities in December 2009, Chomsky began his speech on "The Unipolar Moment and the Culture of Imperialism" by applauding Edward Said for calling attention to America's "culture of imperialism".

When the US establishment celebrated the 20th anniversary of the fall of the Berlin Wall in November 2009, Chomsky said this commemoration ignored a forgotten human rights violation that occurred only one week after that event. On November 16, 1989, the US-armed Atlácatl Battalion in El Salvador assassinated six leading Latin American Jesuit priests, he explained. He contrasted the US' "self-congratulation" of the Berlin Wall destruction with the "resounding silence" that surrounds the assassination of these priests, contending that the US sacrifices democratic principles for its own self-interest, and without any self-criticism it tends to "focus a laser light on the crimes of enemies, but crucially we make sure to never look at ourselves."

=== State terrorism ===
Obama, first of all, is running the biggest terrorist operation that exists, maybe in history.

— Noam Chomsky (2013)

In response to US declarations of a "war on terrorism" in 1981 and the redeclaration in 2001, Chomsky has argued that the major sources of international terrorism are the world's major powers, led by the United States government. He uses a definition of terrorism from a US army manual, which defines it as "the calculated use of violence or threat of violence to attain goals that are political, religious, or ideological in nature. This is done through intimidation, coercion, or instilling fear." In relation to the US invasion of Afghanistan he stated:

Wanton killing of innocent civilians is terrorism, not a war against terrorism. (9-11, p. 76)

On the efficacy of terrorism:

One is the fact that terrorism works. It doesn't fail. It works. Violence usually works. That's world history. Secondly, it's a very serious analytic error to say, as is commonly done, that terrorism is the weapon of the weak. Like other means of violence, it's primarily a weapon of the strong, overwhelmingly, in fact. It is held to be a weapon of the weak because the strong also control the doctrinal systems and their terror doesn't count as terror. Now that's close to universal. I can't think of a historical exception; even the worst mass murderers view the world that way. So take the Nazis. They weren't carrying out terror in occupied Europe. They were protecting the local population from the terrorisms of the partisans. And like other resistance movements, there was terrorism. The Nazis were carrying out counter terror.

As regards support for condemnation of terrorism, Chomsky opines that terrorism (and violence/authority in general) is generally bad and can only be justified in those cases where it is clear that greater terrorism (or violence, or abuse of authority) is thus avoided. In a debate on the legitimacy of political violence in 1967, Chomsky argued that the "terror" of the Vietnam National Liberation Front (Viet Cong) was not justified, but that terror could in theory be justified under certain circumstances:

I don't accept the view that we can just condemn the NLF terror, period, because it was so horrible. I think we really have to ask questions of comparative costs, ugly as that may sound. And if we are going to take a moral position on this – and I think we should – we have to ask both what the consequences were of using terror and not using terror. If it were true that the consequences of not using terror would be that the peasantry in Vietnam would continue to live in the state of the peasantry of the Philippines, then I think the use of terror would be justified. But, as I said before, I don't think it was the use of terror that led to the successes that were achieved.

Chomsky believes that acts he considers terrorism carried out by the US government do not pass this test, and condemnation of United States foreign policy is one of the main thrusts of his writings which he has explained is because he lives in the United States, and thus holds a responsibility for his country's actions.

=== Criticism of United States democracy ===
Chomsky maintains that a nation is only democratic to the degree that government policy reflects informed public opinion. He notes that the US does have formal democratic structures, but they are dysfunctional. He argues that presidential elections are funded by concentrations of private power and orchestrated by the public relations industry, focusing discussion primarily on the qualities and the image of a candidate rather than on issues. Chomsky makes reference to several studies of public opinion by pollsters such as Gallup and Zogby and by academic sources such as the Program on International Policy Attitudes at the University of Maryland (PIPA). Quoting polls taken near the 2004 election, Chomsky points out that only a small minority of voters said they voted because of the candidate's "agendas/ideas/platforms/goals." Furthermore, studies show that the majority of Americans have a stance on domestic issues such as guaranteed health care that is not represented by either major party. Chomsky has contrasted US elections with elections in countries such as Spain, Bolivia, and Brazil, where he claims people are far better informed on important issues.

=== Tactical voting in the United States ===
Since the 2000 election, with regards to third-party voting, Chomsky has maintained "if it's a swing state, keep the worst guys out. If it's another state, do what you feel like." When asked if he voted in the 2008 election, he responded:

I voted green. If I had been in a swing state – this [Massachusetts] is a fixed state – if I had been in a swing state I probably would have held my nose and voted for Obama. Just to keep out the alternative, which is worse. I had no expectations about him and I'm not in the least disillusioned. In fact I wrote about him before the primaries. I thought he was awful.

==== Trump and Biden in 2020 ====
In an interview for The Intercept, Mehdi Hasan asked Chomsky "What do you make of the 'Never Biden' movement?" Chomsky answered

That brings up some memories. In the early 30s in Germany, the communist party, following the Stalinist line at the time, took the position that everybody but us is a social fascist so there's no difference between the social democrats and the Nazis. So therefore we're not going to join with the social democrats to stop the Nazi plague. We know where that led. And there are many other cases like that. And I think we're seeing a rerun of that. So let's take the position "Never Biden, I'm not going to vote for Biden". There is a thing called arithmetic. You can debate a lot of things but not arithmetic. Failure to vote for Biden in this election in a swing state amounts to voting for Trump. It takes one vote away from the opposition, the same as voting for Trump. So if you decide you want to vote for the destruction of organized human life on earth, for a sharp increase in the threat of nuclear war, for stuffing the judiciary with young lawyers who will make it impossible to do anything for a generation, then do it openly, say, "yeah that's what I want". So that's the meaning of "Never Biden".

=== Criticism of intellectual communities ===
Chomsky has at times been outspokenly critical of scholars and other public intellectuals; while his views sometimes place him at odds with individuals on particular points, he has also denounced intellectual sub-communities for what he sees as systemic failings. Chomsky sees two broad problems with academic intellectuals generally:

1. They largely function as a distinct class, and so distinguish themselves by using language inaccessible to people outside the academy, with more or less deliberately exclusionary effects. In Chomsky's view there is little reason to believe that academics are more inclined to engage in profound thought than other members of society and that the designation "intellectual" obscures the truth of the intellectual division of labour: "These are funny words actually, I mean being an 'intellectual' has almost nothing to do with working with your mind; these are two different things. My suspicion is that plenty of people in the crafts, auto mechanics and so on, probably do as much or more intellectual work as people in the universities. There are plenty of areas in academia where what's called 'scholarly' work is just clerical work, and I don't think clerical work's more challenging than fixing an automobile engine – in fact, I think the opposite. ... So if by 'intellectual' you mean people who are using their minds, then it's all over society" (Understanding Power, p. 96).
2. The corollary of this argument is that the privileges enjoyed by intellectuals make them more ideologised and obedient than the rest of society: "If by 'intellectual' you mean people who are a special class who are in the business of imposing thoughts, and framing ideas for people in power, and telling everyone what they should believe, and so on, well, yeah, that's different. These people are called 'intellectuals' – but they're really more a kind of secular priesthood, whose task is to uphold the doctrinal truths of the society. And the population should be anti-intellectual in that respect, I think that's a healthy reaction" (ibid, p. 96; this statement continues the previous quotation).

Chomsky is elsewhere asked what "theoretical" tools he feels can be produced to provide a strong intellectual basis for challenging hegemonic power, and he replies: "if there is a body of theory, well tested and verified, that applies to the conduct of foreign affairs or the resolution of domestic or international conflict, its existence has been kept a well-guarded secret", despite much "pseudo-scientific posturing." Chomsky's general preference is, therefore, to use plain language in speaking with a non-elite audience.

The American Intellectual climate is the focus of "The Responsibility of Intellectuals", the essay which established Chomsky as one of the leading political philosophers in the second half of the 20th century. Chomsky's extensive criticisms of a new type of post-WW2 intellectual he saw arising in the United States were the focus of his book American Power and the New Mandarins. There he described what he saw as the betrayal of the duties of an intellectual to challenge received opinion. The "new Mandarins", who he saw as responsible in part for the Vietnam War, were apologists for United States as an imperial power; he wrote that their ideology demonstrated

the mentality of the colonial civil servant, persuaded of the benevolence of the mother country and the correctness of its vision of world order, and convinced that he understands the true interests of the backward peoples whose welfare he is to administer.

Chomsky has shown cynicism towards the credibility of postmodernism and poststructuralism. In particular he has criticised the Parisian intellectual community; the following disclaimer may be taken as indicative: "I wouldn't say this if I hadn't been explicitly asked for my opinion – and if asked to back it up, I'm going to respond that I don't think it merits the time to do so" (ibid). Chomsky's lack of interest arises from what he sees as a combination of difficult language and limited intellectual or "real world" value, especially in Parisian academe: "Sometimes it gets kind of comical, say in post-modern discourse. Especially around Paris, it has become a comic strip, I mean it's all gibberish ... they try to decode it and see what is the actual meaning behind it, things that you could explain to an eight-year old child. There's nothing there." (Chomsky on Anarchism, pg. 216). This is exacerbated, in his view, by the attention paid to academics by the French press: "in France if you're part of the intellectual elite and you cough, there's a front-page story in Le Monde. That's one of the reasons why French intellectual culture is so farcical – it's like Hollywood" (Understanding Power, pg. 96).

Chomsky made a 1971 appearance on Dutch television with Michel Foucault, the full text of which can be found in Foucault and his Interlocutors, Arnold Davidson (ed.), 1997 (ISBN 0-226-13714-7). Of Foucault, Chomsky wrote that:

... with enough effort, one can extract from his writings some interesting insights and observations, peeling away the framework of obfuscation that is required for respectability in the strange world of intellectuals, which takes on extreme forms in the weird culture of postwar Paris. Foucault is unusual among Paris intellectuals in that at least something is left when one peels this away.

=== Mass media analysis ===
Another focus of Chomsky's political work has been an analysis of mainstream mass media (especially in the United States), which he accuses of maintaining constraints on dialogue so as to promote the interests of corporations and the government.

Edward S. Herman and Chomsky's book Manufacturing Consent: The Political Economy of the Mass Media explores this topic and presents their "propaganda model" hypothesis as a basis to understand the news media with several case studies to support it. According to their propaganda model, more democratic societies like the U.S. use subtle, non-violent means of control, unlike totalitarian societies, where physical force can readily be used to coerce the general population. Chomsky asserts that "propaganda is to a democracy what the bludgeon is to a totalitarian state" (Media Control).

The model attempts to explain such a systemic bias in terms of structural economic causes rather than a conspiracy of people. It argues the bias derives from five "filters" that all published news must pass through which combine to systematically distort news coverage.

1. The first filter, ownership, notes that most major media outlets are owned by large corporations.
2. The second, funding, notes that the outlets derive the majority of their funding from advertising, not readers. Thus, since they are profit-oriented businesses selling a product – readers and audiences – to other businesses (advertisers), the model would expect them to publish news which would reflect the desires and values of those businesses.
3. In addition, the news media are dependent on government institutions and major businesses with strong biases as sources (the third filter) for much of their information.
4. Flak, the fourth filter, refers to the various pressure groups which go after the media for supposed bias and so on when they go out of line.
5. Norms, the fifth filter, refer to the common conceptions shared by those in the profession of journalism.

The model therefore attempts to describe how the media form a decentralized and non-conspiratorial but nonetheless very powerful propaganda system that is able to mobilize an "élite" consensus, frame public debate within "élite" perspectives and at the same time give the appearance of democratic consent.

=== Labour Party under Jeremy Corbyn ===
In May 2017, Chomsky endorsed Labour Party leader Jeremy Corbyn in the UK general election saying, "If I were a voter in Britain, I would vote for him [Jeremy Corbyn]." He claimed that Corbyn would be doing better in opinion polls if it was not for the "bitter" hostility of the mainstream media, he said, "If he had a fair treatment from the media – that would make a big difference."

In November 2019, along with other public figures, Chomsky signed a letter supporting Corbyn describing him as "a beacon of hope in the struggle against emergent far-right nationalism, xenophobia and racism in much of the democratic world" and endorsed him in the 2019 UK general election. In December 2019, along with 42 other leading cultural figures, he signed a letter endorsing the Labour Party under Corbyn's leadership in the 2019 general election. The letter stated that "Labour's election manifesto under Jeremy Corbyn's leadership offers a transformative plan that prioritises the needs of people and the planet over private profit and the vested interests of a few."

=== MIT, military research and student protests ===
The Massachusetts Institute of Technology is a major research center for US military technology. As Chomsky says: "[MIT] was a Pentagon-based university. And I was at a military-funded lab." Having kept quiet about his anti-militarist views in the early years of his career at MIT, Chomsky became more vocal as the war in Vietnam intensified. For example, in 1968, he supported an attempt by MIT's students to give an army deserter sanctuary on campus. He also gave lectures on radical politics.

Throughout this period, MIT's various departments were researching helicopters, smart bombs and counterinsurgency techniques for the war in Vietnam. Jerome Wiesner, the military scientist who had initially employed Chomsky at MIT, also organised a group of researchers from MIT and elsewhere to devise a barrier of mines and cluster bombs between North and South Vietnam. By his own account, back in the 1950s, Wiesner had "helped get the United States ballistic missile program established in the face of strong opposition". He then brought nuclear missile research to MIT – work which, as Chomsky says "was developed right on the MIT campus." Until 1965, much of this work was supervised by a vice-president at MIT, General James McCormack, who had earlier played a significant role supervising the creation of the US's nuclear arsenal. Meanwhile, Professor Wiesner played an important advisory role in organising the US's nuclear command and control systems.

Chomsky has rarely talked about the military research done at his own lab but the situation has been made clear elsewhere. In 1971, the US Army's Office of the Chief of Research and Development published a list of what it called just a "few examples" of the "many RLE research contributions that have had military applications". This list included: "helical antennas", "microwave filters", "missile guidance", "atomic clocks" and "communication theory". Chomsky never produced anything that actually worked for the military. However, by 1963 he had become a "consultant" for the US Air Force's MITRE Corporation who were using his linguistic theories to support "the design and development of U.S. Air Force-supplied command and control systems."

The MITRE documents that refer to this consultancy work are quite clear that they intended to use Chomsky's theories in order to establish natural languages such as English "as an operational language for command and control". According to one of his students, Barbara Partee, who also worked on this project, the military justification for this was: "that in the event of a nuclear war, the generals would be underground with some computers trying to manage things, and that it would probably be easier to teach computers to understand English than to teach the generals to program."

Chomsky's complicated attitude to MIT's military role was expressed in two letters published in the New York Review Books in 1967. In the first, he wrote that he had "given a good bit of thought to ... resigning from MIT, which is, more than any other university associated with the activities of the Department of 'Defense'." He also stated that MIT's "involvement in the [Vietnam] war effort is tragic and indefensible." Then, in the second letter written to clarify the first, Chomsky said that "MIT as an institution has no involvement in the war effort. Individuals at MIT, as elsewhere, have direct involvement and that is what I had in mind."

By 1969, MIT's student activists were actively campaigning "to stop the war research" at MIT. Chomsky was sympathetic to the students but disagreed with their immediate aims. In opposition to the radical students, he argued that it was best to keep military research on campus rather than having it moved away. Against the students' campaign to close down all war-related research, he argued for restricting such research to "systems of a purely defensive and deterrent character". MIT's student president at this time, Michael Albert, has described this position as, in effect, "preserving war research with modest amendments".

During this period, MIT had six students sentenced to prison terms, prompting Chomsky to say that MIT's students suffered things that "should not have happened". Despite this, he has described MIT as "the freest and the most honest and has the best relations between faculty and students than at any other ... [with] quite a good record on civil liberties." Chomsky's differences with student activists at this time led to what he has called "considerable conflict". He described the rebellions across US campuses as "largely misguided" and he was unimpressed by the student uprising of May 1968 in Paris, saying, "I paid virtually no attention to what was going on in Paris as you can see from what I – rightly, I think." On the other hand, Chomsky was also very grateful to the students for raising the issue of the war in Vietnam.

Chomsky's particular interpretation of academic freedom led him to give support to some of MIT's more militaristic academics, even though he disagreed with their actions. For example, in 1969, when he heard that Walt Rostow, a major architect of the Vietnam war, wanted to return to work at the university, Chomsky threatened "to protest publicly" if Rostow was "denied a position at MIT." In 1989, Chomsky then gave support to a long-standing Pentagon adviser, John Deutch, by backing his candidacy for President of MIT. Deutch was an influential advocate of both chemical and nuclear weapons and later became head of the CIA. The New York Times quoted Chomsky as saying, "He has more honesty and integrity than anyone I've ever met in academic life, or any other life. ... If somebody's got to be running the C.I.A., I'm glad it's him."

The Pentagon's enthusiasm for Artificial Intelligence has rekindled its interest in Chomskyan grammar for what they call ‘future combat systems’. A 2021 US Navy proposal hopes that ‘Chomskyan grammar’ might eventually be useful in ‘antisubmarine and countermine warfare'. Chomsky has worked with Jeffrey Watumull, a scientist who is involved with similar Pentagon-sponsored AI projects.

== Comments on world affairs and conflicts ==
Over his career, Chomsky has provided commentary on many world conflicts.

=== Opposition to the Vietnam War ===
Chomsky became one of the most prominent opponents of the Vietnam War in February 1967, with the publication of his essay "The Responsibility of Intellectuals" in the New York Review of Books.

Allen J. Matusow, "The Vietnam War, the Liberals, and the Overthrow of LBJ" (1984):

By 1967 the radicals were obsessed by the war and frustrated by their impotence to affect its course. The government was unmoved by protest, the people were uninformed and apathetic, and American technology was tearing Vietnam apart. What, then, was their responsibility? Noam Chomsky explored this problem in February 1967 in the New York Review, which had become the favorite journal of the radicals. By virtue of their training and leisure, intellectuals had a greater responsibility than ordinary citizens for the actions of the state, Chomsky said. It was their special responsibility 'to speak the truth and expose lies' ... [Chomsky] concluded by quoting an essay written twenty years before by Dwight Macdonald, an essay that implied that in time of crisis exposing lies might not be enough. 'Only those who are willing to resist authority themselves when it conflicts too intolerably with their personal moral code', Macdonald had written, 'only they have the right to condemn'. Chomsky's article was immediately recognized as an important intellectual event. Along with the radical students, radical intellectuals were moving 'from protest to resistance.'

A contemporary reaction came from New York University Professor of Philosophy Emeritus Raziel Abelson:

... Chomsky's morally impassioned and powerfully argued denunciation of American aggression in Vietnam and throughout the world is the most moving political document I have read since the death of Leon Trotsky. It is inspiring to see a brilliant scientist risk his prestige, his access to lucrative government grants, and his reputation for Olympian objectivity by taking a clearcut, no-holds-barred, adversary position on the burning moral-political issue of the day. ...

Chomsky also participated in "resistance" activities, which he described in subsequent essays and letters published in the New York Review of Books: withholding half of his income tax, taking part in the 1967 march on the Pentagon, and spending a night in jail. In the spring of 1972, Chomsky testified on the origins of the war before the Senate Foreign Relations Committee, chaired by J. William Fulbright.

Chomsky's view of the war is different from orthodox anti-war opinion which holds the war as a tragic mistake. He argues that the war was a success from the US point of view. According to Chomsky's view the main aim of US policy was the destruction of the nationalist movements in the Vietnamese peasantry. In particular he argues that US attacks were not a defense of South Vietnam against the North but began directly in the early 1960s (covert US intervention from the 1950s) and at that time were mostly aimed at South Vietnam. He agrees with the view of orthodox historians that the US government was concerned about the possibility of a "domino effect" in South-East Asia. At this point Chomsky diverts from orthodox opinion – he holds that the US government was not so concerned with the spread of state Communism and authoritarianism but rather of nationalist movements that would not be sufficiently subservient to US economic interests.

==== North Vietnamese land reform and the Hue Massacre ====
In their book “After the Cataclysm: Postwar Indochina and the Reconstruction of Imperial Ideology”, Chomsky and Edward S. Herman disputed the veracity of media accounts of war crimes and repression by the Vietnamese communists, stating: "the basic sources for the larger estimates of killings in the North Vietnamese land reform were persons affiliated with the Central Intelligence Agency (CIA) or the Saigon Propaganda Ministry" and "the NLF-DRV 'bloodbath' at Hue (in South Vietnam) was constructed on flimsy evidence indeed". Commenting on postwar Vietnam, Chomsky and Herman argued: "[i]n a phenomenon that has few parallels in Western experience, there appear to have been close to zero retribution deaths in postwar Vietnam." This they described as a "miracle of reconciliation and restraint". In discussing the 1977 Congressional testimony of defecting SRV official Nguyen Cong Hoan, on the subjects of mass repression and the abrogation of civic and religious freedoms, Herman and Chomsky pointed to contradictory accounts of post-war Vietnam concluding that while "some of what Hoan reports is no doubt accurate ...the many visitors and Westerners living in Vietnam who expressly contradict his claims" suggest "Hoan is simply not a reliable commentator".

=== Cambodia and the Khmer Rouge ===
In July 1978, Chomsky and his collaborator, Edward S. Herman reviewed three books about Cambodia. Two of the books by John Barron (and Anthony Paul) and François Ponchaud were based on interviews with Cambodian refugees and concluded that the Khmer Rouge had killed or been responsible for the death of hundreds of thousands of Cambodians. The third book, by scholars Gareth Porter and George Hildebrand, described the Khmer Rouge in highly favorable terms. Chomsky and Herman called Barron and Paul's book "third rate propaganda" and part of a "vast and unprecedented propaganda campaign" against the Khmer Rouge. He said Ponchaud was "worth reading" but unreliable. Chomsky said that refugee stories of KR atrocities should be treated with great "care and caution" as no independent verification was available. By contrast, Chomsky was highly favorable toward the book by Porter and Hildebrand, which portrayed Cambodia under the Khmer Rouge as a "bucolic idyll." Chomsky also opined that the documentation of Gareth Porter's book was superior to that of Ponchaud's, despite almost all of the references cited by Porter coming from Khmer Rouge documents while Ponchaud's came from speaking to Cambodian refugees.

Chomsky and Herman later co-authored a book about Cambodia titled After the Cataclysm (1979), which appeared after the Khmer Rouge regime had been deposed. The book was described by Cambodian scholar Sophal Ear as "one of the most supportive books of the Khmer revolution" in which they "perform what amounts to a defense of the Khmer Rouge cloaked in an attack on the media". In the book, Chomsky and Herman acknowledged that "The record of atrocities in Cambodia is substantial and often gruesome", but questioned their scale, which may have been inflated "by a factor of 100". Khmer Rouge agricultural policies reportedly produced "spectacular" results."

Contrary to Chomsky and Herman, the reports of massive Khmer Rouge atrocities and starvation in Cambodia proved to be accurate and uninflated. Many deniers or doubters of the Cambodian genocide recanted their previous opinions, but Chomsky continued to insist that his analysis of Cambodia was without error based on the information available to him at the time. Herman addressed critics in 2001: "Chomsky and I found that the very asking of questions about ... the victims in the anti-Khmer Rouge propaganda campaign of 1975–1979 was unacceptable, and was treated almost without exception as 'apologetics for Pol Pot'."

Chomsky's biographers look at this issue in different ways. In Noam Chomsky: A life of Dissent, Robert Barsky focuses on Steven Lukes' critique of Chomsky in The Times Higher Education Supplement. Barsky cites Lukes' claim that, obsessed by his opposition to the United States' role in Indochina, Chomsky had "lost all sense of perspective" when it came to Pol Pot's Cambodia. Barsky then cites a response by Chomsky in which he says that, by making no mention of this, Lukes is demonstrating himself to be an apologist for the crimes in Timor and adds on this subject, "Let us say that someone in the US or UK... did deny Pol Pot atrocities. That person would be a positive saint as compared to Lukes, who denies comparable atrocities for which he himself shares responsibility and know how to bring to an end, if he chose". Barsky concludes that the vigor of Chomsky's remarks "reflects the contempt that he feels" for all such arguments.

In Decoding Chomsky, Chris Knight takes a rather different approach. He claims that because Chomsky never felt comfortable about working in a military-funded laboratory at MIT, he was reluctant to be too critical of any regime that was being targeted by that same military. Knight writes that "while Chomsky has denounced the Russian Bolsheviks of 1917, he has been less hostile towards the so-called communist regimes which later took power in Asia. ... He also seemed reluctant to acknowledge the full horror of the 'communist' regime in Cambodia. The explanation I favour is that it pained Chomsky's conscience to denounce people anywhere who were being threatened by the very war machine that was funding his research."

=== East Timor ===
In 1975, the Indonesian army, under the command of President Suharto, invaded East Timor, occupying it until 1999, which resulted in between 80,000 and 200,000 East Timorese deaths. A detailed statistical report prepared for the Commission for Reception, Truth and Reconciliation in East Timor cited a lower range of 102,800 conflict-related deaths in the period 1974–1999, namely, approximately 18,600 killings and 84,200 'excess' deaths from hunger and illness. The former figure is considered "proportionately comparable" to the Cambodian genocide though the total deaths in the latter were incomparably more.

Chomsky argued that decisive military, financial and diplomatic support was provided to Suharto's regime, by successive U.S. administrations; beginning with Gerald Ford who, with Henry Kissinger as Secretary of State, provided a 'green light' to the invasion. Prior to the invasion, the U.S. had supplied the Indonesian army with 90% of its arms, and "by 1977 Indonesia found itself short of weapons, an indication of the scale of its attack. The Carter Administration accelerated the arms flow. Britain joined in as atrocities peaked in 1978, while France announced that it would sell arms to Indonesia and protect it from any public "embarrassment". Others, too, sought to gain what profit they could from the slaughter and torture of Timorese." This humanitarian catastrophe went virtually unnoticed by the international community.

Noam Chomsky attempted to raise consciousness about the crisis at a very early stage. In November 1978 and October 1979, Chomsky delivered statements to the Fourth Committee of the U.N. General Assembly about the East Timor tragedy and the lack of media coverage.

In 1999, when it became clear that the majority of Timorese people were poised to vote in favour of their national independence in U.N. sponsored elections, Indonesian armed forces and paramilitary groups reacted by attempting to terrorize the population. At this time Chomsky chose to remind Americans of the three principal reasons why he felt they should care about East Timor:

First, since the Indonesian invasion of December 1975, East Timor has been the site of some of the worst atrocities of the modern era – atrocities which are mounting again right now. Second, the US government has played a decisive role in escalating these atrocities and can easily act to mitigate or terminate them. It is not necessary to bomb Jakarta or impose economic sanctions. Throughout, it would have sufficed for Washington to withdraw support and to inform its Indonesian client that the game was over. That remains true as the situation reaches a crucial turning point – the third reason.

Weeks later, following the independence vote, the Indonesian military drove "hundreds of thousands from their homes and destroying most of the country. For the first time the atrocities were well publicized in the United States."

Australian historian Clinton Fernandes, writes that "When Indonesia invaded East Timor with US support in 1975, Chomsky joined other activists in a tireless campaign of international solidarity. His speeches and publications on this topic were prodigious and widely read, but his financial support is less well known. When the US media were refusing to interview Timorese refugees, claiming that they had no access to them, Chomsky personally paid for the airfares of several refugees, bringing them from Lisbon to the US, where he tried to get them into the editorial offices of The New York Times and other outlets. Most of his financial commitment to such causes has – because of his own reticence – gone unnoticed. A Timorese activist says, "we learnt that the Chomsky factor and East Timor were a deadly combination" and "proved to be too powerful for those who tried to defeat us".

Standing before The UN Independent Special Commission of Inquiry for Timor-Leste whose major report was released in 2006. Arnold Kohen a U.S. activist vitally important to the raising of Western consciousness of the catastrophe since 1975, testified that,

Chomsky's words on this matter had a real influence, sometimes indirect, and history should record it, because it was of vital importance in helping alter the state of widespread ignorance about East Timor that then existed in the United States and elsewhere.

When José Ramos-Horta and Bishop Carlos Belo of East Timor were honored with the Nobel Peace Prize, Chomsky responded "That was great, a wonderful thing. I ran into José Ramos-Horta in São Paulo. I haven't seen his official speech yet, but certainly he was saying in public that the prize should have been given to Xanana Gusmão, who is the leader of the resistance to Indonesian aggression. He's in an Indonesian jail. But the recognition of the struggle is a very important thing, or will be an important thing if we can turn it into something."

=== Bosnian War and the Srebrenica massacre ===
Chomsky has been criticized for not calling the Bosnian War's Srebrenica massacre a "genocide". While he did not deny the fact of the massacre, which he called "a horror story and major crime", he felt that it did not meet the definition of genocide. Critics have accused Chomsky of denying the Bosnian genocide.

=== Israel and Palestine ===
Chomsky "grew up ... in the Jewish-Zionist cultural tradition" (Peck, p. 11). His father was one of the foremost scholars of the Hebrew language and taught at a religious school. Chomsky has also had a long fascination with and involvement in Zionist politics. As he described:

I was deeply interested in ... Zionist affairs and activities – or what was then called 'Zionist,' though the same ideas and concerns are now called 'anti-Zionist.' I was interested in socialist, binationalist options for Palestine, and in the kibbutzim and the whole cooperative labor system that had developed in the Jewish settlement there (the Yishuv) ... The vague ideas I had at the time [1947] were to go to Palestine, perhaps to a kibbutz, to try to become involved in efforts at Arab-Jewish cooperation within a socialist framework, opposed to the deeply antidemocratic concept of a Jewish state (a position that was considered well within the mainstream of Zionism).

He is highly critical of the policies of Israel towards the Palestinians and its Arab neighbors. His book The Fateful Triangle is considered one of the premier texts on the Israeli-Palestinian conflict among those who oppose Israel's policies in regard to the Palestinians as well as American support for the state of Israel. He has also accused Israel of "guiding state terrorism" for selling weapons to apartheid South Africa and Latin American countries that he characterizes as U.S. puppet states, e.g. Guatemala in the 1980s, as well as U.S.-backed paramilitaries (or, according to Chomsky, terrorists) such as the Nicaraguan Contras. (What Uncle Sam Really Wants, Chapter 2.4) Chomsky characterizes Israel as a "mercenary state", "an Israeli Sparta", and a militarized dependency within a U.S. system of hegemony. He has also fiercely criticized sectors of the American Jewish community for their role in obtaining U.S. support, stating that "they should more properly be called 'supporters of the moral degeneration and ultimate destruction of Israel'" (Fateful Triangle, p. 4). He says of the Anti-Defamation League (ADL):

The leading official monitor of anti-Semitism, the Anti-Defamation League of B'nai B'rith, interprets anti-Semitism as unwillingness to conform to its requirements with regard to support for Israeli authorities. ... The logic is straightforward: Anti-Semitism is opposition to the interests of Israel (as the ADL sees them). ... The ADL has virtually abandoned its earlier role as a civil rights organization, becoming 'one of the main pillars' of Israeli propaganda in the U.S., as the Israeli press casually describes it, engaged in surveillance, blacklisting, compilation of FBI-style files circulated to adherents for the purpose of defamation, angry public responses to criticism of Israeli actions, and so on. These efforts, buttressed by insinuations of anti-Semitism or direct accusations, are intended to deflect or undermine opposition to Israeli policies, including Israel's refusal, with U.S. support, to move towards a general political settlement.

Chomsky has further defined himself as having held Zionist beliefs, although he notes that his definition of Zionism would be considered by most as anti-Zionism these days, the result of what he perceives to have been a shift (since the 1940s) in the meaning of Zionism.

In a 2004 interview with Jennifer Bleyer published The Ugly Planet, issue two and in Heeb magazine, Chomsky stated:

It ends up that about 90% of the land [in Israel] is reserved for people of Jewish race, religion and origin. If 90% of the land in the United States were reserved for people of white, Christian race, religion and origin, I'd be opposed. So would the ADL. We should accept universal values.

In May 2013, Chomsky, along with other professors such as Malcolm Levitt, advised Stephen Hawking to boycott an Israeli conference.

As a result of his views on the Middle East, Chomsky was banned from entering Israel in 2010.

=== Iraq War ===
Chomsky opposed the Iraq War for what he saw as its consequences for the international system, namely that the war perpetuated a system in which power and force trump diplomacy and law. He summarised this view in Hegemony or Survival, writing:

Putting aside the crucial question of who will be in charge [of post-war Iraq], those concerned with the tragedy of Iraq had three basic goals: (1) overthrowing the tyranny, (2) ending the sanctions that were targeting the people, not the rulers, and (3) preserving some semblance of world order. There can be no disagreement among decent people on the first two goals: achieving them is an occasion for rejoicing. ... The second goal could surely have been achieved, and possibly the first as well, without undermining the third. The Bush administration openly declared its intention to dismantle what remained of the system of world order and to control the world by force, with Iraq serving as the "petri dish", as the New York Times called it, for establishing the new "norms."

=== Cuban embargo ===
The conduct of international affairs resembles the Mafia. The Godfather does not tolerate defiance, even from some small storekeeper.

— Noam Chomsky

In February 2009, Chomsky described the publicly stated U.S. goal of bringing "democracy to the Cuban people" as "unusually vulgar propaganda". In Chomsky's view, the U.S. embargo of Cuba has actually achieved its stated purpose. The goal of the embargo according to Chomsky has been to implement "intensive U.S. terror operations" and "harsh economic warfare" in order to cause "rising discomfort among hungry Cubans" in the hope that out of desperation they would overthrow the regime. In lieu of this goal, Chomsky believes that "U.S. policy has achieved its actual goals" in causing "bitter suffering among Cubans, impeding economic development, and undermining moves towards more internal democracy." In Chomsky's view, the real "threat of Cuba" is that successful independent development on the island might stimulate others who suffer from similar problems to follow the same course, thus causing the "system of U.S. domination" to unravel.

=== Turkey and the Kurds ===
In the 1990s, it was the Kurdish population of Turkey that suffered the most brutal repression. Tens of thousands were killed, thousands of towns and villages were destroyed, millions driven from the lands and homes, with hideous barbarity and torture. The Clinton administration gave crucial support throughout, providing Turkey lavishly with means of destruction. In the single year 1997, Clinton sent more arms to Turkey than the US sent to this major ally during the entire Cold War period combined up to the onset of the counterinsurgency operations. Turkey became the leading recipient of US arms, apart from Israel-Egypt, a separate category. Clinton provided 80% of Turkish arms, doing his utmost to ensure that Turkish violence would succeed. Virtual media silence made a significant contribution to these efforts.

— Noam Chomsky, August 9, 2008

Chomsky has been very critical of Turkey's policies in regards to their Kurdish population, while also denouncing the military aid given to the Turkish government by the United States. Such aid Chomsky states allowed Turkey during the 1990s to conduct "US-backed terrorist campaigns" in southeast Turkey, which Chomsky believes "rank among the most terrible crimes of the grisly 1990s", featuring "tens of thousands dead" and "every imaginable form of barbaric torture." In 2016 he was one of the signatories of a petition of the Academics for Peace called “We will not be a party to this crime!” demanding a peaceful solution for the Kurdish—Turkish conflict.

Chomsky has described contemporary Turkey as a degrading democracy:

Erdogan in Turkey is basically trying to create something like the Ottoman Caliphate, with him as caliph, supreme leader, throwing his weight around all over the place, and destroying the remnants of democracy in Turkey at the same time.

==== Litigation against Turkish courts ====
In 2002 the Turkish state indicted a Turkish publisher, Fatih Tas, for distributing a collection of Chomsky's essays under the title "American Intervention". The state charged that the book "promoted separatism" violating Article 8 of the Turkish Anti-Terror Law. One essay in the book was a reprint of a speech that Chomsky had made in Toledo, Ohio containing material claiming that the Turkish state had brutally repressed its Kurdish population. Prosecutors cited the following passages as particularly offensive:

In 1984, the Turkish government launched a major war in the Southeast against the Kurdish population. And that continued. In fact it's still continuing.

If we look at US military aid to Turkey -which is usually a pretty good index of policy- Turkey was of course a strategic ally so it always had a fairly high level of military aid. But the aid shot up in 1984, at the time that the counterinsurgency war began. This had nothing to do with Cold War, transparently. It was because of the counterinsurgency war. The aid remained high, peaking through the 1990s as the atrocities increased. The peak year was 1997. In fact in the single year 1997, US military aid to Turkey was greater than in the entire period of 1950 to 1983 when there were allegedly Cold War issues. The end result was pretty awesome: tens of thousands of people killed, two to three million refugees, massive ethnic cleansing with some 3500 villages destroyed-about seven times Kosovo under NATO bombing, and there's nobody bombing in this case, except for the Turkish air forces using planes that Clinton sent to them with the certain knowledge that that's how they would be used.

At the request of Turkish activists, Chomsky petitioned the Turkish courts to name him as a co-defendant. He testified at the court trial in Istanbul in 2002. Fatih Tas was acquitted. After the trial the BBC reported Tas as saying, "If Chomsky hadn't been here we wouldn't have expected such a verdict."

While Chomsky was in Turkey for the trial he traveled to the southern city of Diyarbakır, the unofficial capital of the Kurdish population in Turkey, where he delivered a controversial speech, urging the Kurds to form an autonomous, self-governing community. Police handed recorded cassettes and translations of the speech over to Turkish courts for investigation a few days later.

In June 2006, Turkish publisher Tas was again prosecuted, along with two editors and a translator, for publishing a Turkish translation of Manufacturing Consent, authored by Chomsky and Edward S. Herman. The defendants were accused under articles 216 and 301 of the Turkish Penal Code for "publicly denigrating Turkishness, the Republic and the Parliament" and "inciting hatred and enmity among the people". In December 2006, the four defendants were acquitted by Turkish courts.

In 2003, in the New Humanist, Chomsky wrote about repression of free speech in Turkey and "the courage and dedication of the leading artists, writers, academics, journalists, publishers and others who carry on the daily struggle for freedom of speech and human rights, not just with statements but also with regular acts of civil disobedience. Some have spent a good part of their lives in Turkish prisons because of their insistence on recording the true history of the miserably oppressed Kurdish population."

=== Sri Lanka conflict ===
Chomsky supports the Tamils' right to self-determination in Tamil Eelam, their homeland in the North and East of Sri Lanka. In a February 2009 interview, he said of the Tamil Eelam struggle: "Parts of Europe, for example, are moving towards more federal arrangements. In Spain, for example, Catalonia by now has a high degree of autonomy within the Spanish state. The Basque Country also has a high degree of autonomy. In England, Wales and Scotland in the United Kingdom are moving towards a form of autonomy and self-determination and I think there are similar developments throughout Europe. Though they're mixed with a lot of pros and cons, but by and large I think it is a generally healthy development. I mean, the people have different interests, different cultural backgrounds, different concerns, and there should be special arrangements to allow them to pursue their special interests and concerns in harmony with others."

In a September 2009 submitted Sri Lankan Crisis Statement, Chomsky was one of several signatories calling for full access to internment camps holding Tamils, the respect of international law concerning prisoners of war and media freedom, the condemnation of discrimination against Tamils by the state since independence from Britain, and to urge the international community to support and facilitate a political solution that addresses the self-determination aspirations of Tamils and protection of the human rights of all Sri Lankans. A major offensive against the Tamils in the Vanni region of their homeland in 2009 resulted in the deaths of at least 20,000 Tamil civilians in 5 months, amid widespread concerns war crimes were committed against the Tamil population. At a United Nations forum on R2P, the Responsibility to Protect doctrine established by the UN in 2005, Chomsky said:

... What happened in Sri Lanka was a major Rwanda-like atrocity, in a different scale, where the West didn't care. There was plenty of early warning. This [conflict] has been going on for years and decades. Plenty of things could have been done [to prevent it]. But there was not enough interest.

Chomsky was responding to a question that referred to Jan Egeland, former head of the UN's Humanitarian Affairs' earlier statement that R2P was a failure in Sri Lanka.

=== Scottish independence ===
During the 2014 Scottish independence referendum, Chomsky supported Scottish independence as a move towards greater political decentralisation in Europe.

=== Irish unity ===
In December 2021, Chomsky participated in a discussion with Ógra Shinn Féin, the youth wing of the Irish Republican political party, Sinn Féin. During the discussion, Chomsky voiced his support for the re-unification of Ireland, describing it as "part of the forward march of history; a long time coming in the case of Ireland - 800 years in fact" and that "a united Ireland, sooner or later, will come. The signs are there. These artificial divisions can’t survive."

=== Russia and Ukraine ===
In March 2022, Chomsky called the Russian invasion of Ukraine a "major war crime", ranking alongside the U.S.-led invasion of Iraq and the German–Soviet invasion of Poland in 1939, adding, "It always makes sense to seek explanations, but there is no justification, no extenuation." In October 2022, he called on the U.S. to stop "undermining negotiations" between Ukraine and Russia. He argued that NATO's "eastward expansion" and the prospect of Ukraine joining the alliance had provoked Russia's invasion, alleging that the United States had rejected Russian demands for Ukrainian neutrality and a negotiated compromise.

In an interview with New Statesman published in April 2023, Chomsky is quoted in saying that Russia was fighting more "humanely" in Ukraine than the U.S. did in Iraq, and that Russia was "acting with restraint and moderation" as Ukraine had not suffered "large-scale destruction of infrastructure" compared to Iraq. Chomsky also asserted that Ukraine was not a free actor, that it was the U.S. and then United Kingdom which refused peace negotiations to further their own national interests, and that U.S. military aid to Ukraine is aimed at degrading Russian military forces. Chomsky also argued that the applications to join NATO by Sweden and Finland had "nothing to do with fear of a Russian attack, which has never been even conceived", but instead was to give both countries new markets for their military industries and access to advanced equipment.

=== China and Taiwan ===
In an interview with New Statesman published in April 2023, Chomsky said that China was "not a nice country" and violated international law in the South China Sea. However, on the political status of Taiwan, Chomsky asserted that the talk of war over Taiwan was "coming from the West", and the U.S. was aiming to "encircle China".

== Other comments ==
=== 9/11 conspiracy theories ===
Chomsky has dismissed 9/11 conspiracy theories, stating that there is no credible evidence to support the claim that the United States government was responsible for the attacks.

I think the Bush administration would have had to be utterly insane to try anything like what is alleged, for their own narrow interests, and do not think that serious evidence has been provided to support claims about actions that would not only be outlandish, for their own interests, but that have no remote historical parallel.

In addition, Chomsky said he would not be surprised if the conspiracy theory movement is being fueled by the government establishment to distract the public from more pressing matters.

People always ask, 'What can I do?' And then they say, here's something I can do. I can become a qualified civil engineer in an hour, and prove that Bush blew up the World Trade Center. I'm pretty sure that in Washington they must be clapping. A couple of years ago, I came across a Pentagon document that was about declassification procedures. Among other things, it proposed that the government should periodically declassify information about the Kennedy assassination. Let people trace whether Kennedy was killed by the mafia, so activists will go off on a wild goose chase instead of pursuing real problems or getting organized. It wouldn't shock me if thirty years from now we discover in the declassified record that the 9/11 [conspiracy] industry was also being fed by the [Bush] administration.

== Reception ==
=== Marginalization in the mainstream media ===
Chomsky has, rarely, appeared in popular media outlets in the United States such as CNN, Time magazine, Foreign Policy, and others. However, his recorded lectures are regularly replayed by NPR stations in the United States that carry the broadcasts of Alternative Radio, a syndicator of progressive lectures. Critics of Chomsky have argued his mainstream media coverage is adequate, and not unusual considering the fact that academics in general often receive low priority in the American media.

When CNN presenter Jeff Greenfield was asked why Chomsky was never on his show, he claimed that Chomsky might "be one of the leading intellectuals who can't talk on television. ... If you['ve] got a 22-minute show, and a guy takes five minutes to warm up, ... he's out". Greenfield described this need to "say things between two commercials" as the media's requirement for "concision". Chomsky has elaborated on this, saying that "the beauty of [concision] is that you can only repeat conventional thoughts. If you repeat conventional thoughts, you require zero evidence, like saying Osama Bin Laden is a bad guy, no evidence is required. However, if you say something that is true, although not a conventional truth, like the United States attacked South Vietnam, people are going to rightfully want evidence, and a whole lot of it, as they should. The format of the shows do not allow this type of evidence which is one of the reasons concision is critical." He's continued that if the media were better propagandists they would invite dissidents to speak more often because the time restraint would stop them from properly explaining their radical views and they "would sound like they were from Neptune." For this reason, Chomsky rejects many offers to appear on TV, preferring the written medium.

Since his book 9-11 became a bestseller in the aftermath of the September 11, 2001, attacks, Chomsky has attracted more attention from the mainstream American media. For example, The New York Times published an article in May 2002 describing the popularity of 9-11. In January 2004, the Times published a highly critical review of Chomsky's Hegemony or Survival by Samantha Power, and in February, the Times published an op-ed by Chomsky himself, criticizing the Israeli West Bank Barrier for taking Palestinian land.

=== Worldwide audience ===
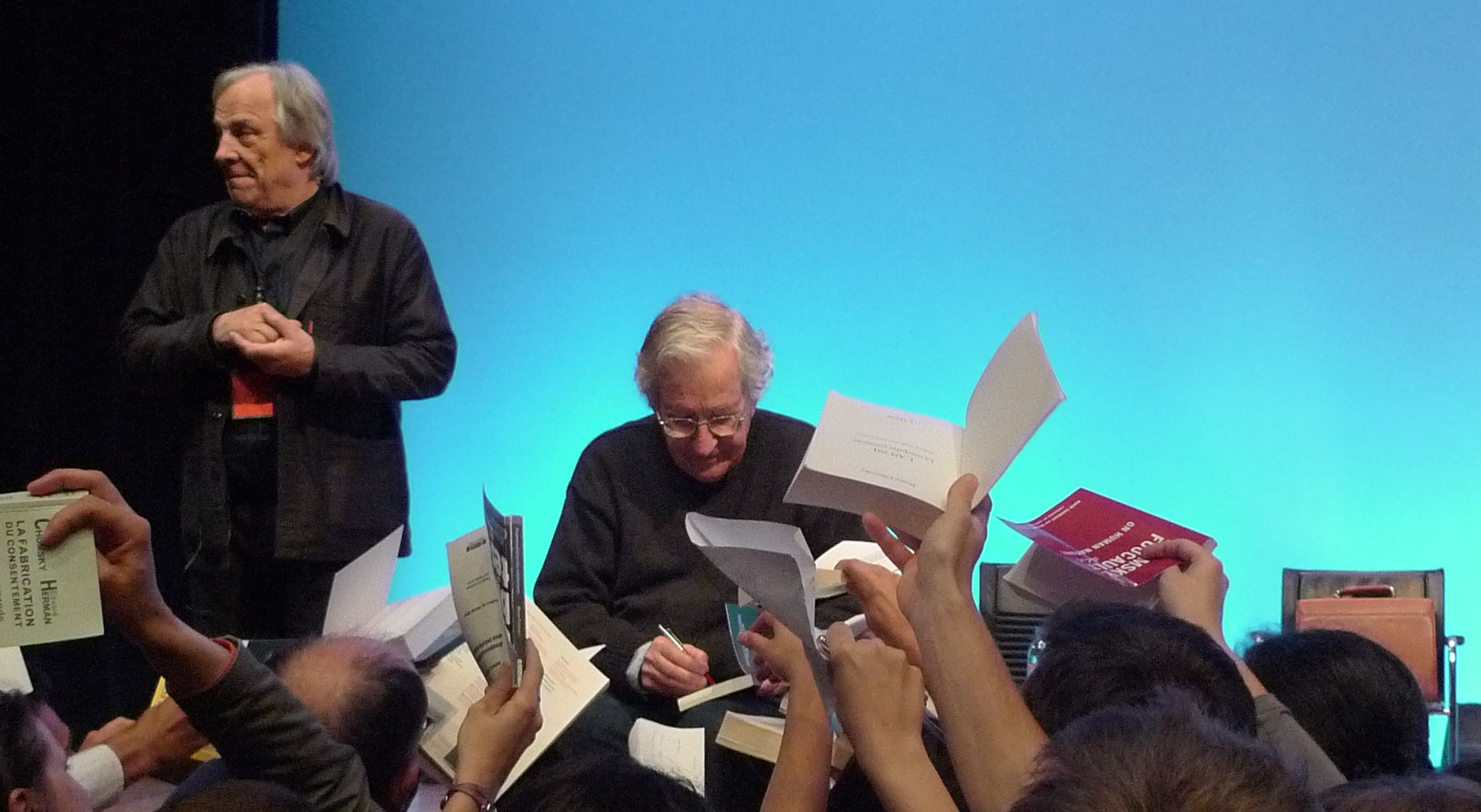
Chomsky in Paris (2010-05-29)

Despite his marginalization in the mainstream US media, Chomsky is one of the most globally famous figures of the left, especially among academics and university students, and frequently travels across the United States, Europe, and the Third World. He has a very large following of supporters worldwide as well as a dense speaking schedule, drawing large crowds wherever he goes. He is often booked up to two years in advance. He was one of the main speakers at the 2002 World Social Forum. He is interviewed at length in alternative media.

The 1992 film Manufacturing Consent, was shown widely on college campuses and broadcast on PBS. It is the highest-grossing Canadian-made documentary film in history.

Many of his books are bestsellers, including 9-11, which was published in 26 countries and translated into 23 languages; it was a bestseller in at least five countries, including Canada and Japan. Chomsky's views are often given coverage on public broadcasting networks around the world – in marked contrast to his rare appearances in the US media. In the UK, for example, he appears periodically on the BBC.

Venezuelan President Hugo Chávez was known to be an admirer of Chomsky's books. He held up Chomsky's book Hegemony or Survival during his speech to the United Nations General Assembly in September 2006.

== See also ==
- Military Keynesianism
- Operation Gladio
