= Year 501: The Conquest Continues =

Chomsky book

First edition (publ. South End Press, Boston)

Year 501: The Conquest Continues, by Noam Chomsky, first published in 1993, outlines a history of the world from 1492 to 1992 as a response to celebrations of the Columbus Quincentenary. Chomsky describes the book as "concerned with central themes of the 500-year European conquest of the world that was commemorated on October 12, 1992 the forms they are likely to assume in the coming years."

Chomsky referenced the forthcoming book in a September 1992 article and gave the fourth Raymond Williams Memorial Lecture in London in November 1992 on the topic "Year 501". First published in English (1993), translated into Spanish (1993), German (1993), Portuguese (1993), Greek (1994), Italian (1994), French (1995), Arabic (1996), Serbian (1998), Polish (1999), Korean (2000). A new edition with a new preface was published in English in 2015 by Haymarket Books and Pluto Press. The new edition was also published in French (2016) and Turkish (2017).

Chomsky's book Rethinking Camelot: JFK, the Vietnam War, and U.S. Political Culture started off as chapters for Year 501 but was developed into its own book.

== Critical reception ==
Year 501 received reviews in a number of publications in English (Monthly Review Press, Kirkus Reviews, International Journal of Cultural Property, Race and Class), in Polish (Przegląd Tygodniowy, Rzeczpospolita), in French (Philosophie Magazine, Le Monde diplomatique), in Korean (The Daedong Historical Journal).

In a 1993 C-SPAN interview in response to a question as to why his recent books were difficult to find, including Year 501, Chomsky stated they are "not reviewed so its hard to know about them and they're usually printed by small presses which don't have the resources to advertise." He further explained why his books are hard to find was because "they say unpopular things. One book of mine happens to be on the US media it was a best-seller in Canada...It was based on lectures given over Canadian Broadcasting Corporation. I don't think it had a single review in the United States. Why should the American media want to publicize a critical analysis of the American media."

David Armitage writes in the International Journal of Cultural Property that "many of Chomsky's arguments become as monocausal and hence undeniable as the ideological strains which he is attacking" and that the book "ultimately fails as a polemic because it presents no conception of how a neo-liberal world order might be overturned, how the benefits of a global economy might be maximised for the good of all, nor how an imperial self-interest seemingly as old as political communities themselves could ever be abandoned."

Howard Zinn writes that "Year 501 is another awesome achievement by Noam Chomsky. It is a devastating array of information about the U.S. role in the world, placed in the long historical perspective of the 500 years that followed the voyages of Columbus. The result is a wonderful single-volume education in history and world politics."

== Contents ==
PART I: Old Wine, New Bottles

1. The Savage Injustice of the Europeans
2. Felling Trees and Indians
3. Showers of Benevolence

Chapter 2: The Contours of World Order

1. The Logic of North-South Relations
2. After Colonialism
3. The Rich Men's Club
4. The End of the Affluent Alliance
5. The "Vile Maxim of the Masters"
6. The New Imperial Age

Chapter 3: North-South/East-West

1. An Oversize "Rotten Apple"
2. Logical Illogicality
3. Return to Normalcy
4. Some Free Market Successes
5. After the Cold War
6. The Soft Line

PART II: High Principles

Chapter 4: Democracy and the Market

1. The Freedom that Counts
2. The Flight of the Bumble Bee
3. The Good News
4. Reshaping Industrial Policy

Chapter 5: Human Rights: The Pragmatic Criterion

1. Reality and its Abuse
2. Securing the Anchor
3. Celebration
4. Closing the Books

PART III: Persistent Themes

Chapter 6: A "Ripe Fruit"

Chapter 7: World Orders Old and New: Latin America

1. "The Colossus of the South"
2. "The Welfare of the World Capitalist System"
3. Protecting Democracy
4. Securing the Victory
5. "A Real American Success Story"
6. Fundamentalism Triumphant
7. Some Competitors for the Prize
8. "Our Nature and Traditions"
9. Some Tools of the Trade

Chapter 8: The Tragedy of Haiti

1. "The First Free Nation of Free Men"
2. "Unselfish Intervention"
3. "Politics, not Principle"

Chapter 9: The Burden of Responsibility

1. Irrational Disdain
2. Laboratory Animals
3. Indian Removal and the Vile Maxim
4. "The American Psyche"

PART IV: Memories

Chapter 10: Murdering History

1. Murdering History
2. The Date which will Live in Infamy
3. Missing Pieces
4. Some Lessons in Political Correctness
5. "Self-Pity" and other Character Flaws
6. On Sensitivity to History
7. "Thief! Thief!"
8. A Date which does not Live in Infamy

Chapter 11: The Third World at Home

1. The Paradox of '92
2. Fight to the Death
3. To Consult Our Neighbor
