= Harry Kreisler =

American historian

Harry Kreisler (/ˈkraɪslər/ KRY-slər; born Galveston, Texas) is an American historian who was formerly executive director of the Institute of International Studies at University of California, Berkeley.

== Career ==
Kreisler was the executive director of the Institute of International Studies at the University of California from 1974 to 2014. In that role, he administered interdisciplinary academic and public affairs programs that analyzed global issues. His reflections on that work is recorded in an interview broadcast in 2014.

He is best known as the creator and host of the television program Conversations with History. In these video interviews, distinguished men and women from around the world talk about their lives and their work. Guests include diplomats, statesmen, and soldiers; economists and political analysts; scientists and historians; writers and foreign correspondents; activists and artists. The interviews include discussion of political, economic, military, legal, cultural, and social issues shaping our world. The program was conceived by Kreisler as a way to capture through conversation the intellectual ferment of our times. First broadcast in 1982, Conversations with History now comprises over 650 interviews. A collection of Kreisler's interviews, Political Awakenings: Conversations with History, was published by the New Press in 2011.
