= Making the Future =

2012 book by Noam Chomsky

- Author: Noam Chomsky
- Language: English
- Series: Open Media Series
- Subject: International politics
- Publisher: City Lights Books
- Publication date: February 2012
- Publication place: United States
- Media type: Print (Paperback)
- Pages: 320
- ISBN: 9780872865372
- Preceded by: Interventions

Making the Future: Occupations, Interventions, Empire and Resistance is a 2012 collection of political op-ed columns written by Noam Chomsky and edited by John Stickney for monthly publication by the New York Times Syndicate between April 2, 2007, and October 31, 2011. The columns, according to Stickney, "present a narrative of the events that have made the future since 2007," including War in Afghanistan and Iraq, the 2008 U.S. presidential race; the Chinese Century, the pink tide, nuclear proliferation, the Gaza War, Israeli settlement, climate change, the 2008 financial crisis, the Arab Spring, the death of Osama bin Laden and the Occupy movement.

== Background ==
Noam Chomsky (1928) was born in Philadelphia, Pennsylvania, to Jewish immigrants from Eastern Europe. Becoming academically involved in the field of linguistics, Chomsky eventually secured a job as Professor of Department of Linguistics & Philosophy at the Massachusetts Institute of Technology. In the field of linguistics, he is credited as the creator or co-creator of the Chomsky hierarchy, the universal grammar theory, and the Chomsky–Schützenberger theorems. Politically, Chomsky had held radical leftist views since childhood, identifying himself with anarcho-syndicalism and libertarian socialism. He was particularly known for his critiques of U.S. foreign policy and contemporary capitalism, and he has been described as a prominent cultural figure.

Chomsky was first approached to write an op-ed column for the New York Times Syndicate on the first anniversary of the September 11 attacks on the basis of his highly influential volume 9/11 (2001). The international attention garnered by the subsequent column, entitled 9-11: Lessons Unlearned, convinced the publishers to commission Chomsky to write roughly 1000-words a month which they would then distribute as op-ed pieces. These are widely picked up overseas, but rarely in the United States and The New York Times itself never published them to its own readers. Internationally, the op-eds have appeared in the mainstream European press including The International Herald Tribune, The Guardian, and The Independent. Regional newspapers in the US that did pick up the op-eds were The Register Guard, The Dayton Daily News, and The Knoxville Voice. The first volume of these, collecting columns from September 2002 to March 2007, was published as Interventions (2007).
