= Knowledge of Language =

1986 book by Noam Chomsky

- First edition
- Author: Noam Chomsky
- Language: English
- Genre: Non-fiction
- Publisher: Praeger Special Studies
- Publication date: 1986

Knowledge of Language: Its Nature, Origin, and Use is a book by American linguist Noam Chomsky, first published in 1986. In this book, Chomsky deals with topics in the philosophy of language and the philosophy of mind. He argues that the study of linguistic structures provides insight into the workings of human mind.
