= Interventions (Chomsky book) =

2007 book by Noam Chomsky

- First US edition
- Author: Noam Chomsky
- Publisher: City Lights Books (US); Hamish Hamilton (UK)
- Publication date: May 2007
- Media type: Print (Paperback)
- Pages: 232
- ISBN: 0-87286-483-9
- OCLC: 71350487
- Dewey Decimal: 327.73009/0511 22
- LC Class: E902 .C476 2007
- Followed by: Making the Future

Interventions is a book by Noam Chomsky, an American academic linguist and political activist. Published in May 2007, Interventions is a collection of 44 op-ed articles, post-9/11, from September 2002, through March 2007. The book's subjects span from 9/11 and the Iraq War to social security and intelligent design, South America and Asia, the Israeli occupation of Palestine and the election of Hamas, Hurricane Katrina, and the US concept of "just war". The Pentagon banned the book from its Guantanamo Bay prison because it might negatively "impact ... good order and discipline." Chomsky replied that, "This happens sometimes in totalitarian regimes."

== Background ==
Chomsky was first approached to write an op-ed column for the New York Times Syndicate on the first anniversary of the September 11 attacks on the basis of his work 9/11 (2001). The international attention garnered by the subsequent column, entitled "9-11: Lessons Unlearned", convinced the publishers to commission Chomsky to write roughly 1,000 words a month which they would then distribute as op-ed pieces. These columns were syndicated overseas, but rarely licensed in the United States; The New York Times itself did not publish them. A second volume of these, collecting columns from April 2, 2007, to October 31, 2011, was published as Making the Future (2012).

== See also ==
- September 11 attacks
- Interventionism (politics)
- Foreign policy of the United States
