= The Cambridge Companion to Chomsky =

2005 survey edited by James McGilvray

- Front cover
- Editor: James McGilvray
- Subject: Essay collection
- Publisher: Cambridge University Press
- Publication date: 2005
- Pages: 335
- ISBN: 0521780136

The Cambridge Companion to Chomsky is a 2005 book that surveys the thought and influence of Noam Chomsky. Edited by James McGilvray and published by Cambridge University Press in their Cambridge Companions series, the book received a second edition in 2017.
