= The New Press =

American non-profit public-interest book publisher

- Status: Active
- Founded: 1992; 33 years ago
- Founder: André Schiffrin; Diane Wachtell
- Country of origin: United States
- Headquarters location: New York City
- Distribution: Two Rivers Distribution (US); Turnaround Publisher Services (UK); Codasat Canada (Canada); Ingram Publisher Services (UK); Grandtham Book Services (Europe); NewSouth Books (Australia); Jonathan Ball (South Africa); Penguin Books (India)
- Publication types: Books
- Official website: thenewpress.org

The New Press is an independent non-profit public-interest book publisher established in 1992 by André Schiffrin (Chevalier of the Légion d'honneur) and Diane Wachtell, publishing many books with a left-wing political viewpoint.

== Details ==
In 1990, André Schiffrin resigned as editor-in-chief of Pantheon Books and within two years raised enough money to launch the New Press, with former Pantheon editor Diane Wachtell. Many of Schiffrin's authors from Pantheon, including Studs Terkel, left to join him.

The New Press is a nonprofit organization whose stated mission is to publish books that "promote and enrich public discussion and understanding of the issues vital to our democracy and to a more equitable world." Schiffrin compared The New Press's role to that of public television, radio, and university presses, focusing it on books with riskier subjects; many New Press books have promoted social activism and liberal causes, which Calvin Reid of Publishers Weekly has characterized as the publisher's main mission. The New Press's business model combines publishing revenue with philanthropic grants, and it has long focused on academic partnerships as well as staff and author diversity, running an intern program aimed at attracting candidates from minority ethnic backgrounds to the publishing industry. Victor Navasky, writing in The Nation in 2013, called it "a bold experiment in nonprofit, relatively radical book publishing," whose fifty books published per year were "virtually all [...] of social consequence."

Schiffrin was editor in chief for more than a decade, and remained "founding director and editor at large" until his death in 2013. In 2020 the board of directors included Gara Lamarche, Theodore M. Shaw, Sarah Burnes, Amy Glickman, and Diane Wachtell.

Notable New Press authors include Alice Walker and Bill Moyers. John W. Dower's Embracing Defeat: Japan in the Wake of World War II was published by New Press and won the Pulitzer Prize for General Nonfiction in 2000. Best selling New Press books include The Good War by Studs Terkel; The New Jim Crow by Michelle Alexander; and Understanding Power by Noam Chomsky.

Three New Press books were featured in Publishers Weekly's Best Books of 2018: Sohaila Abdulali's What We Talk About When We Talk About Rape, AERA president Vanessa Siddle Walker's The Lost Education of Horace Tate, and Patrick Chamoiseau's Slave Old Man.

== Awards ==
New Press books that have won awards:

- 1994: George Wittenborn Memorial Award from the Art Libraries Society of North America for Mining the Museum: an Installation by Fred Wilson, edited by Lisa G. Corrin.
- 1994: Lincoln Prize in Civil War History for Free at Last: A Documentary History of Slavery, Freedom, and the Civil War edited by Ira Berlin, Barbara Fields, Steven Miller, Joseph Reidy and Leslie Rowland.
- 1996: International Center of Photography's Infinity Award for Writing to Picturing Us: African American Identity in Photography by Deborah Willis.
- 2000: Pulitzer Prize for General Nonfiction for John W. Dower's Embracing Defeat: Japan in the Wake of World War II.
- 2015: Silver Gavel Award from the American Bar Association to Nell Bernstein. Burning Down the House: The End of Juvenile Prison.
- 2015: Martin Duberman named an Honor Book for the Stonewall Book Award, Hold Tight Gently: Michael Callen, Essex Hemphill, and the Battlefield of AIDS
