= The Logical Structure of Linguistic Theory =

Book by Noam Chomsky

- First edition
- Author: Noam Chomsky
- Language: English
- Subject: Natural language syntax
- Publisher: Plenum
- Publication date: 1975 (written 1955)
- Media type: Print
- Pages: 592
- ISBN: 9780306307607

The Logical Structure of Linguistic Theory or LSLT is a major work in linguistics by American linguist Noam Chomsky. It was written in 1955 and published in 1975. In 1955, Chomsky submitted a part of this book as his PhD thesis titled Transformational Analysis, setting out his ideas on transformational grammar; he was awarded a Ph.D. for it, and it was privately distributed among specialists on microfilm. Chomsky offered the manuscript of LSLT for publication, but MIT's Technology Press refused to publish it. It was published by Plenum in 1975. It was republished in 1985 by U. of Chicago Press and in 2010 by Springer.
