= For Reasons of State =

1973 essay collection by Noam Chomsky

- Author: Noam Chomsky
- Subject: World politics
- Publisher: Random House
- Publication date: 1973
- Pages: 330

For Reasons of State is a 1973 collection of political essays by Noam Chomsky.

== Contents ==
- The Backroom Boys
- The Wider War
- The Rule of Force in International Affairs
- Indochina: The Next Phase
- On the Limits of Civil Disobedience
- The Function of the University in a Time of Crisis
- Psychology and Ideology
- Notes on Anarchism
- Language and Freedom
