= Deterring Democracy =

1991 book by Noam Chomsky

- Cover of the first edition
- Author: Noam Chomsky
- Publisher: Verso Books, Haymarket Books
- Publication date: 1991, 2024
- Media type: Print
- Pages: 421
- ISBN: 9798888901427
- OCLC: 243729342
- Dewey Decimal: 327.73 20
- LC Class: E881 .C48 1992

Deterring Democracy is a book published in 1991 by Noam Chomsky, which explores the differences between the humanitarian rhetoric and imperialistic reality of United States foreign policy and how it affects various countries around the world. It was re-released by Haymarket Books in February 2024.

In the book, Chomsky explores the idea that the US is the only remaining world superpower that works to maintain its dominance, even ruthlessly employing violence such as outright invasions and overthrowing governments pursuing independent economic policies. He also discusses the large difference between public opinion on the Cold War, establishment American educated opinion and reality.

The book also contains criticism aimed at the Soviet Union and other communist states, but its major point centres on the fact that although the United States claimed to support freedom in the Cold War, it still supported authoritarian regimes. The conclusion that Chomsky comes to is that, despite U.S claims of supporting freedom, their actual aim was maintaining dominance over resources and geopolitical power.

The full text of the book is available online.
