= American Empire Project =

Non-Fiction Book Series

The American Empire Project is a book series that deals with imperialist and exceptionalist tendencies in US foreign policy in the early 21st century. The series is published by Metropolitan Books and includes contributions by such notable American thinkers and authors as Noam Chomsky, Howard Zinn, Chalmers Johnson and Andrew Bacevich. The project's goal is to critique what the authors consider the imperial ambitions of the United States and to explore viable alternatives for foreign policy.

The American Empire Project was founded by Tom Engelhardt and Steven Fraser and started publication in 2004. It includes revised or reprinted editions of older books, as well as new books published for the first time.

== American Empire Project book list ==
A partial list of books in the project:

- A People's History of American Empire (2008); by Howard Zinn, Paul Buhle, Mike Konopacki
- A Question of Torture: CIA Interrogation, from the Cold War to the War on Terror (2006); by Alfred McCoy
- Ain’t My America: The Long, Noble History of Antiwar Conservatism and Middle-American Anti-Imperialism (2008); by Bill Kauffman
- Blood and Oil: The Dangers and Consequences of America's Growing Petroleum Dependency; by Michael T. Klare
- Blowback: The Costs and Consequences of American Empire, Revised edition; by Chalmers Johnson
- Crusade: Chronicles of an Unjust War; by James Carroll
- Devil's Game: How the United States Helped Unleash Fundamentalist Islam; by Robert Dreyfuss
- Dilemmas of Domination: The Unmaking of the American Empire; by Walden Bello
- Empire's Workshop: Latin America, the United States, and the Rise of the New Imperialism; by Greg Grandin
- Failed States: The Abuse of Power and the Assault on Democracy; by Noam Chomsky
- Hegemony or Survival: America's Quest for Global Dominance (2003); by Noam Chomsky
- How to Succeed at Globalization: A Primer for Roadside Vendors; by El Fisgón
- Imperial Ambitions: Conversations on the Post 9/11 World; by Noam Chomsky
- In the Name of Democracy: American War Crimes in Iraq and Beyond; by Jeremy Brecher, Jill Cutler, and Brendan Smith
- Iraq: The Logic of Withdrawal; by Anthony Arnove
- Kill Anything That Moves: The Real American War in Vietnam; by Nick Turse
- Nemesis: The Last Days of the American Republic; by Chalmers Johnson
- The Seventh Decade: The New Shape of Nuclear Danger; by Jonathan Schell
- The Sorrows of Empire: Militarism, Secrecy, and the End of the Republic; by Chalmers Johnson
- The Complex: How the Military Invades Our Everyday Lives; by Nick Turse
- The Limits of Power: The End of American Exceptionalism; by Andrew Bacevich
- War Powers: How the Imperial Presidency Hijacked the Constitution; by Peter Irons
- What We Say Goes: Conversations on U.S. Power in a Changing World: Interviews with David Barsamian; by Noam Chomsky and David Barsamian

== See also ==
- American Century
- American exceptionalism
- American imperialism
