= The Complex: How the Military Invades Our Everyday Lives =

2008 book by Nick Turse

The Complex
- Book cover
- Author: Nick Turse
- Language: English
- Subject: United States military
- Publisher: Metropolitan Books
- Publication date: 2008
- Publication place: United States
- Media type: Hardcover
- Pages: 304
- ISBN: 0-8050-7896-7
- Dewey Decimal: 338.4/735500973 22
- LC Class: HC110.D4 T873 2008

The Complex: How the Military Invades Our Everyday Lives is a book about the United States military, written by investigative journalist Nick Turse. It was published in 2008 in hardcover format by Metropolitan Books. The book describes the vast changes in the U.S. military-industrial complex from the days of President Dwight D. Eisenhower to 2008, its effect on American society, and how the military and private business spheres interact with each other. The book received positive reviews in Mother Jones and Inter Press Service, and a critical review in Kirkus Reviews.

== Background ==
Nick Turse received a PhD from Columbia University in Sociomedical Sciences. His Ph.D. dissertation is titled: " 'Kill Anything That Moves': United States War Crimes and Atrocities in Vietnam, 1965–1973 ", and it utilized the war-crime archive and historical texts to analyze the doctrine of atrocity. Turse is the research director of TomDispatch.com, a project of The Nation Institute. He is the recipient of a James Aronson Award for Social Justice Journalism, and in 2009 received a Ridenhour Prize for Reportorial Distinction. The Complex is Turse's first book.

== Synopsis ==
Nick Turse explores how the industrial complex of the United States military has pervaded the everyday lives of Americans. Turse investigates the relationship between the Pentagon and the Hollywood entertainment industry, military actions in the civilian sphere, and joint projects between the U.S. military and companies including NASCAR and Marvel Comics. Turse describes how military tacticians and flyers were outfitted with Apple PowerBooks. He illustrates how the military has attempted innovative methods to reach out to and recruit contemporary youth, including making "friends" on MySpace. Turse notes that the research and development budget of the military, and its spending in the private sector, has increased dramatically over the last few years. The book posits that many changes have occurred since President Dwight D. Eisenhower's military-industrial complex, and relates the changes to the present day.

== Reception ==
The book was reviewed in Kirkus Reviews, where it was recommended: "For those who like their journalism fevered and their politics pat." Tom Engelhardt of Mother Jones magazine wrote, "It's an eye-opener on the degree to which we are, without realizing it, a militarized society." Engelhardt called The Complex a "superb book". Chris Barsanti of PopMatters gave the book a rating of 3 out of a possible 10, and wrote, "The Complex is an airless and rather pointless recitation of facts that feels cut-and-pasted rather than written."

Ali Gharib reviewed the book for Inter Press Service, and noted: "Turse's book carefully tracks the Defense Department's money trail to everything from traditional defense contractors to a handful of Southern catfish restaurants to Dunkin' Donuts." Victoria Segal of The Guardian reviewed the book and commented, "Much of Turse's research holds the Pentagon up to ridicule: their golf courses, the fast-food-addicted army that waddles rather than marches on its stomach. Yet the book turns sinister when it exposes desperate recruiters who allow white supremacists to join up, or defence department plans to develop 'weaponised' moths and sharks. References to The Matrix could make Turse seem a paranoid geek. Unfortunately, this is no sci-fi fantasy." David Swanson of Political Affairs Magazine wrote, "Nick Turse has done something pretty amazing in producing an entertaining account of the almost limitless variety of ways in which our money is wasted by what he calls the military industrial technological entertainment academic media corporate matrix, or 'The Complex' for short".

== See also ==
- Vietnam War Crimes Working Group Files
