= Operation Speedy Express =

Part of the Vietnam War (1968–1969)

- Part of the Vietnam War
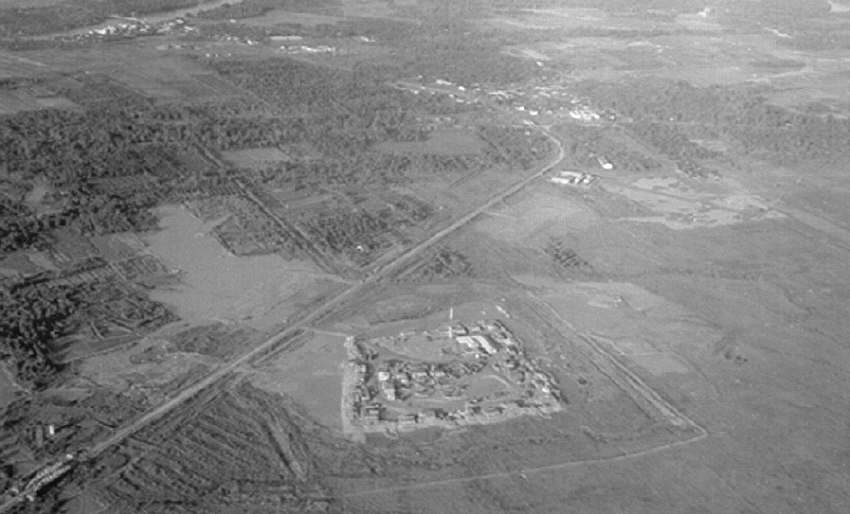
- Fire Support Base Danger, headquarters of an element of the 1st Brigade, 9th U.S. Infantry Division, Định Tường Province
Date	1 December 1968 – 31 May 1969
Location	Mekong Delta provinces Định Tường, Kiến Hòa and Gò Công, Republic of Vietnam
Result	U.S. claims operational success VC claims U.S. operational failure

Belligerents
United States	Viet Cong

Commanders and leaders
MG Julian Ewell	Unknown

Units involved
1st Brigade, 9th U.S. Infantry Division	Unknown

Strength
8,000	Undetermined

Casualties and losses
242 killed	10,889 killed 688 individual and 60 crew-served weapons recovered Department of Defense Internal Report and others: 5,000 to 7,000 civilian casualties Viet Cong report: 3,000 civilians killed

Operation Speedy Express was a controversial military operation conducted by the United States Army's 9th Infantry Division during the Vietnam War in the Mekong Delta provinces of Kiến Hòa and Vĩnh Bình from December 1968 to May 1969. The operation, led by Major-General Julian Ewell, was part of counterinsurgency operations by the United States Armed Forces which targeted the Viet Cong (VC). U.S. forces aimed to interdict VC lines of communication and prevent Viet Cong personnel from establishing outposts in the region via the operation. The U.S. claimed the operation was successful in achieving its objectives, although the VC denied this and claimed the operation failed to stop their activities in the region.

The number of Vietnamese casualties that resulted from the operation is controversial. The U.S. Army's official body count estimate of VC fighters killed was 10,889, but this has been described as an exaggeration and the U.S. Army inspector general estimated that there may have been between 5,000 and 7,000 Vietnamese civilian casualties during the operation. Fewer than 750 weapons were captured by American forces. A VC report from December 1969, stated that the US military killed 3,000 civilians and destroyed thousands of houses, and hundreds of hectares of fields and orchards, during the operation.

== Overview ==
In late 1968 the 1st Brigade, 9th U.S. Infantry Division operated in Định Tường Province, using night ambush tactics; the 2nd Brigade continued its mission with the Mobile Riverine Force. Although engagements in the operation were typically small, the 9th Infantry Division fought several sizeable engagements. The objective was summarized by a U.S. Army publication to take the "war to the enemy in the Delta and sever his supply lines from Cambodia".

The U.S. military used 8,000 infantrymen, 50 artillery pieces, 50 helicopters and extensive aerial bombardment. The United States Air Force (USAF) used fighter bombers to carry out 3,381 tactical air strikes. The military also employed "people-sniffer" devices that detected traces of carbon and ammonia.

== Operation ==
The operation commenced on 1 December 1968 but was only formally announced on 2 March 1969.

=== February ===
On 2 February between 19:50 and 20:15, infantry from the 1st Brigade supported by helicopter gunships from the 12th Combat Aviation Group (12th CAG) engaged an unknown size enemy force in two contacts 11 miles (18 km) northeast of Cao Lanh. During the 25 minute battle, 16 enemy soldiers were killed (11 killed by air). There were no U.S. casualties.

On 8 February at approximately 21:15 helicopter gunships from the 12th CAG on a night reconnaissance mission detected an unknown number of enemy soldiers in Sampans in an area 30 miles (48 km) northwest of Cao Linh and 1 mile (1.6 km) south of the Cambodian border. The area was illuminated and the gunships attacked the sampans. The enemy returned fire with small arms and automatic weapons and the action continued into the night with USAF AC-47 Spooky gunships also engaging the enemy. The bodies of 24 PAVN/VC were observed lying in the strike area and five sampans were destroyed. There were no U.S. casualties.

On 11 February at 14:30 helicopter gunships from the air cavalry squadron of the 164th Combat Aviation Group on a Delta Blackhawk mission observed an unknown size enemy force in sampans 35 miles (56 km) northwest of Cao Lanh. The gunships attacked the sampans with machine guns and rockets and they returned fire with small arms and automatic weapons. Civilian Irregular Defense Group program (CIDG) troops were landed in the area and made contact with an enemy force and the action continued until 15:50 when the enemy withdrew leaving 38 dead and five sampans destroyed. There were no U.S. or CIDG casualties. On 14 February in scattered contacts 7 miles (11 km) north-northwest of Thuy Dong helicopter gunships from the 12th CAG killed 28 PAVN/VC for no U.S. losses.

On 17 February at 15:15 reconnaissance aircraft sighted numerous sampans with an unknown number of enemy soldiers onboard 9 miles (14 km) southeast of Cao Lanh. At about 18:00 the sampans were attacked by helicopter gunships and the enemy returned fire with small arms and automatic weapons. The action continued until 19:30 when the enemy withdrew leaving 16 dead and 21 sampans destroyed. At 23:20 a unit of the 1st Brigade ambushed an enemy unit on four sampans 2 miles (3.2 km) east of Cái Bè. Helicopter gunships provided support and all four sampans were destroyed and ten PAVN/VC killed for no U.S. losses. On 19 February helicopters from the 164th Combat Aviation Group (164th CAG) operating over Bạc Liêu Province attacked scattered groups of PAVN/VC killing nine, destroying 70 structures and 14 sampans and capturing seven individual weapons.

On 24 February at 10:00 a unit of the 1st Brigade on a sweep 5 miles (8.0 km) east-southeast of Cai Cai Camp discovered eight PAVN/VC bodies that had been killed the previous day and a 75mm recoilless rifle, four AK-47s, two RPG-7s and assorted munitions. On 27 February at 19:30 a unit of the 1st Brigade supported by the air cavalry squadron of the 164th CAG engaged a PAVN/VC force 6 miles (9.7 km) northwest of Cái Bè. The PAVN/VC returned fire and the action continued until 21:30 when the PAVN/VC withdrew leaving 36 killed for no U.S. casualties.

=== March ===
On 4 March at approximately 20:45 1st Brigade infantry ambushed a PAVN/VC squad 9 miles (14 km) west-northwest of Cái Bè and helicopter gunships attacked an enemy force resulting in 15 PAVN/VC killed and one captured for no U.S. losses. On 5/6 March in operations 3 miles (4.8 km) northeast of Cái Bè 1st Brigade infantry and 164th CAG gunships engaged small groups of PAVN/VC killing 35 and destroying 12 sampans.

On 11 March in scattered actions between midnight and 04:00 1st Brigade infantry and 164th CAG gunships killed 18 PAVN/VC 9 miles (14 km) northwest of Cai Lậy District. At 12:55 1st Brigade infantry engaged an estimated VC battalion 9 miles northwest of Cai Lậy. Other 1st Brigade troops were landed in the area and helicopter gunships and airstrikes were conducted throughout the day and night. The VC withdrew before dawn leaving 57 dead and eight individual weapons, U.S. losses were one killed. A UH-1 was shot down during the action and crash-landed.

On 13 March at 03:40 a 1st Brigade unit engaged two VC platoons 12 miles (19 km) west-northwest of Cái Bè. The VC withdrew after two hours leaving 17 dead while U.S. losses were two dead. On 14 March at 16:00 helicopter gunships from the 164th CAG supporting ARVN troops engaged a PAVN/VC force 6 miles (9.7 km) west of Kiên Hưng killing 36. A UH-1 and an OH-6 were shot down 14 miles (23 km) north of Kiên Long in Chương Thiện Province.

On 15 March at 00:40 a unit from the 2nd Brigade operating 7 miles (11 km) northwest of Bến Tre engaged a PAVN/VC squad killing six. A further 20 were killed in later scattered contacts. Later that day helicopter gunships killed a further 18 PAVN/VC. At 19:30 a reconnaissance platoon from the 2nd Brigade ambushed a PAVN/VC platoon 6 miles (9.7 km) northwest of Bến Tre killing 19. From 19:40 to 21:40 helicopter gunships from the 164th CAG engaged scattered groups of PAVN/VC 9 miles (14 km) northwest of Cái Bè killing 16. At 21:00 a reconnaissance platoon from the 1st Brigade engaged a PAVN/VC platoon 3 miles (4.8 km) northwest of Cái Bè killing 15 and destroying two sampans. On 16 March at 20:00 a 1st Brigade unit operating 5 miles (8.0 km) north of Cái Bè engaged approximately 35 PAVN/VC killing 23. At 20:25 another PAVN/VC force was engaged in the same area resulting in 14 killed. An O-1 was shot down 7 miles (11 km) northwest of Bến Tre and both crewmembers killed.

On 21 March at 19:25 a unit of the 2nd Brigade operating 5 miles (8.0 km) northeast of Bến Tre engaged a PAVN/VC force killing 40 for the loss of one U.S. killed. On 22 March at 20:00 a unit from the 2nd Brigade supported by helicopter gunships engaged a PAVN/VC force 8 miles (13 km) southwest of Bến Tre killing 39.

On 23 March during the early morning while operating 14 miles (23 km) southeast of Cao Lanh a 1st Brigade unit supported by helicopter gunships engaged two VC platoons. The VC withdrew after an hour leaving 34 dead and one captured and four individual weapons, U.S. losses were two killed. At 15:00 in the same general area a 1st Brigade unit engaged two PAVN/VC companies, the action continued until 22:30 with helicopter gunships and tactical fighter providing support. The PAVN/VC lost 77 killed, 11 individual and nine crew-served weapons and three radios, U.S. losses were two killed. At 16:40 a unit of the 2nd Brigade freed ten South Vietnamese being held captive 11 miles (18 km) south-southwest of Bến Tre.

On 24 March at midday a unit from the 1st Brigade engaged a VC force 12 miles (19 km) southeast of Cao Lanh. the action continued until 16:00 and resulted in 11 VC killed and eight individual weapons captured. At 20:45 helicopter gunships attacked a PAVN/VC platoon 5 miles (8.0 km) northeast of Bến Tre killing 31. On 26 March at 20:45 a 2nd Brigade unit ambushed a PAVN/VC force 6 miles (9.7 km) east of Bến Tre killing ten. On 27 March between 18:00 and 23:30 helicopter gunships from the 164th CAG attacked a PAVN/VC platoon 8 miles (13 km) northeast of Cai Lậy in three separate contacts killing 19 and destroying three sampans. On 28 March at 21:30 helicopter gunships from the 164th CAG engaged scattered PAVN/VC groups 9 miles (14 km) north of Cái Bè killing 26. At 22:30 a division unit in a night defensive position 5 miles (8.0 km) northeast of Cai Lậy received a probing attack, the unit returned fire supported by helicopter gunships and 12 PAVN/VC dead were found in the area.

On 30 March from 20:00 to midnight helicopter gunships from the 164th CAG engaged PAVN/VC forces 7 miles (11 km) northeast of Cai Lậy killing 39 and destroying 18 sampans. On 31 March at 12:40 a 1st Brigade unit engaged a PAVN/VC force 6 miles (9.7 km) northwest of Cái Bè. The engagement continued until 16:15 when the PAVN/VC withdrew leaving 30 dead and ten individual weapons. From 21:00 to 23:00 infantry from the 2nd Brigade engaged a PAVN/VC company 3 miles (4.8 km) east of Bến Tre killing 23 and capturing one.

=== May ===
On 4 May at 09:50 a unit of the 1st Brigade engaged a PAVN/VC squad 8 miles (13 km) west of Cái Bè killing seven.

On 11 May at 12:15 air cavalry units attacked an area 6 miles (9.7 km) northwest of Bến Tre and a 2nd Brigade unit searched the area finding 16 PAVN/VC dead and eight individual and two crew-served weapons. Further contacts later that day killed a further 21 PAVN/VC and captured six individual weapons, U.S. losses were one killed. On 12 May an OH-6 was shot down 4 miles (6.4 km) northeast of Bến Tre and both crewmen killed. On 17 May at 19:45 a 2nd Brigade unit supported by helicopter gunships engaged a PAVN/VC force 5 miles (8.0 km) south of Bến Tre killing 14 and destroying six sampans. On 19 May at 18:00 a 2nd Brigade unit engaged a PAVN/VC force 3 miles (4.8 km) east of Bến Tre killing 17.

On 21 May at 19:30 a 2nd Brigade unit supported by helicopter gunships engaged a PAVN/VC force 2 miles (3.2 km) northeast of Bến Tre. Twelve secondary explosions were observed and 21 PAVN/VC killed. On 22 May at 09:30 a 1st Brigade unit engaged a PAVN/VC force 9 miles (14 km) west of Cái Bè. The action continued until 23:10 and the bodies of 101 PAVN/VC dead and 21 individual weapons were found. On 23 May at 11:15 a 2nd Brigade unit supported by helicopter gunships engaged a PAVN/VC force 10 miles (16 km) northwest of Bến Tre. The fighting continued until 17:10, 22 PAVN/VC and six U.S. were killed. On 24 May at 15:00 a 2nd Brigade unit supported by helicopter gunships engaged a PAVN/VC company 6 miles (9.7 km) northwest of Bến Tre. The PAVN/VC withdrew by 18:20 leaving 92 dead.

The operation concluded on 31 May.

== Aftermath ==
The U.S. Army claimed 10,899 PAVN/VC dead and 2,579 suspects detained, while 242 U.S. soldiers were killed and 2,385 wounded (a kill ratio of 45:1) and 688 individual and 60 crew-served weapons recovered (a ratio of enemy killed to weapons seized of 14.6:1).

According to Le Quan Cong, a VC platoon commander during Speedy Express, the operation failed to interdict the VC. He also said: "most of the people killed were civilians, because civilians would run, we soldiers held our fighting position so they could not get us, they had wiped out whole villages". The VC claimed a strategic victory, claiming that their fighters and bases were left mostly intact and their presence in the region was not removed by the operation.

=== Controversy over civilian killings ===
In December 1969 in the aftermath of the revelation of the My Lai massacre, stories began to appear in the press that atrocities by Americans and their allies were far more commonplace in South Vietnam than the U.S. government was willing to admit. Robert Kaylor of United Press International alleged that according to American pacification advisers in the Mekong Delta during the operation, the division had indulged in the "wanton killing" of civilians through the "indiscriminate use of mass firepower. Ewell refuted the report, describing it to COMUSMACV General Creighton Abrams as "the biggest collection of malicious innuendo I have ever seen."

In June 1972, Newsweek's Saigon Bureau Chief, Kevin Buckley working with Alexander Shimkin, wrote an article titled "Pacification's Deadly Price" that questioned the spectacular ratio of U.S. dead to purported VC, as well the small number of weapons recovered, and suggested that perhaps more than 5,000 of the dead were innocent civilians (quoting an unnamed U.S. official). Buckley's statements were based on extensive interviews conducted by him and Shimkin, who was fluent in Vietnamese. Although Buckley acknowledged that VC infrastructure and control in the region was extensive, he wrote that local hospitals had treated more wounds caused by U.S. firepower than by the VC. Bến Tre provincial hospital in Kien Hoa, treated 1,882 civilians with war related injuries during the operation. 76% (1,431) of them were injured by American fire power while 451 were wounded by VC fire.

In response to the issues raised by the Newsweek story, the Chief of MACV Information at the time, Colonel Phillip H. Stevens, observed that MACV investigators had attributed the low number of weapons captured to the nature of the terrain and the tactics Ewell had used. In the delta it was easy for the enemy to dispose of weapons by dropping them in canals, streams and paddies. A high percentage of casualties had also been inflicted at night or by aviation units, making the retrieval of weapons almost impossible. "In some heavily booby trapped areas, the number of weapons which might have been captured would not have justified the number of casualties that probably would have been sustained to locate them." On top of that, Stevens said, many members of guerrilla units in the region were unequipped with individual firearms.

The US Army Inspector General estimated that there were 5,000 to 7,000 civilian casualties from the operation.

Ewell was allegedly known to be obsessed with body counts and favorable kill ratios and said "the hearts and minds approach can be overdone....in the delta the only way to overcome VC control and terror is with brute force applied against the VC". David Hackworth was a battalion commander during Speedy Express; according to him, "a lot of innocent Vietnamese civilians got slaughtered because of the Ewell-Hunt drive to have the highest count in the land." Hackworth added that "the 9th Division had the lowest weapons-captured-to-enemy-killed ratio in Vietnam." According to Hackworth, Ewell's policies would later earn him the nickname the "Butcher of the Delta" from members of the 9th Division. According to Geoffrey Ward and Ken Burns in The Vietnam War: An Intimate History, Ewell was apparently proud of this nickname, and saw nothing wrong with what the soldiers under his command had done.

Ward and Burns also wrote that the operation targeted "people running, people in black pajamas, civilians past night-time" and that commanders and infantry units were forced into the field, and they were told they were not to leave until an acceptable number of "kills" were made. Nick Turse in his book Kill Anything That Moves asserts that "free fire zones", where any human present could be killed, helped the 9th Division achieve an unlikely enemy-to-GI kill ratio of 134:1 in April 1969. Robert G. Gard Jr., who served as artillery commander under Ewell and commenting on his superior officer stated "the idea that we killed only enemy combatants is about as gross an exaggeration as I could imagine, but to talk about ratios of forty-five to one simply defies my imagination." John Paul Vann estimated that of those killed in the Delta, "at least 30 percent were noncombatants".

More recently, former Senator (and eventual Secretary of Defense) Charles Hagel of Nebraska, a veteran of the 9th Infantry, alleged that some U.S. commanders on the ground inflated the body count during the operation since this was how their success was judged: "You used that body count, commanding officers did, as the metric and measurement of how successful you were...."

In a 2008 article in The Nation, reporter Nick Turse, references a VC report released in December 1969, which stated that during the operation between 1 December 1968, and 1 April 1969, the US military "mopped up many areas, slaughtering 3,000 people, mostly old folks, women and children, and destroying thousands of houses, hundreds of hectares of fields and orchards."

The operation and its civilian toll are also examined in the 2026 documentary Soldier's Bones, which follows Shimkin's investigation of the killings.

== See also ==
- Human Rights Record of the United States
- My Lai massacre
- Pentagon Papers
- Phoenix Program
- Russell Tribunal
- Tiger Force
- United States war crimes
- Vietnam War Crimes Working Group
- Winter Soldier Investigation
