= Another World Is Possible =

Another World Is Possible may refer to:

- Another World Is Possible: Globalization and Anti-Capitalism, a 2001 book by David McNally
- "Another World Is Possible", an interview with Noam Chomsky in the 2005 collection Imperial Ambitions
- Another World Is Possible, a 2005-2007 film series by Jamie Moffett
- Another World Is Possible Un altro mondo è possibile, a 2001 Italian documentary directed by Mario Monicelli
- "Another world is possible", the slogan of the World Social Forum (active 2001-present)
- The Another World Is Possible Coalition, a anarchist network formed in 2001 by Direct Action Network members

== See also ==
- Another World Is Possible If…, a 2004 book by Susan George
