= Vietnam War body count controversy =

Counting of enemy dead by the United States Armed Forces during the Vietnam War

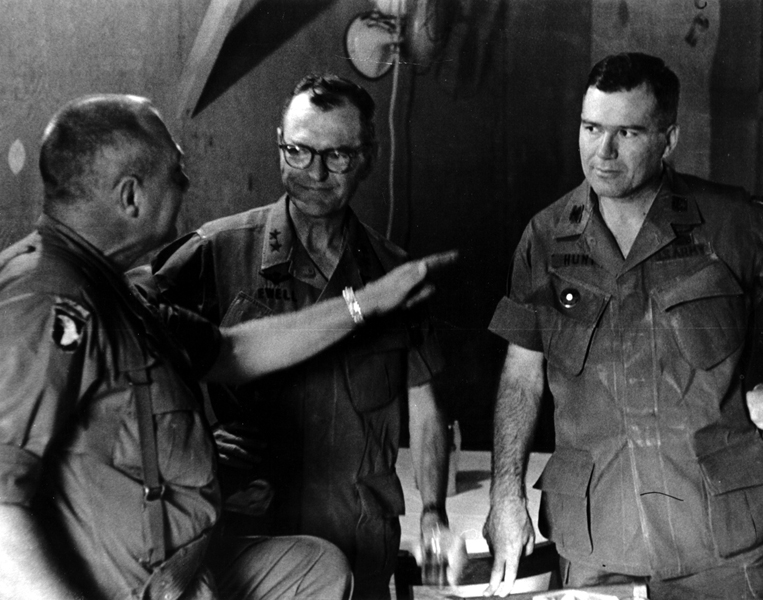
Major General Julian Ewell (center), a major proponent of body counts during the war

The Vietnam War body count controversy centers on the counting of enemy dead by the United States Armed Forces during the Vietnam War (1955–1975). There are issues around killing and counting unarmed civilians (non-combatants) as enemy combatants, as well as inflating the number of actual enemy who were killed in action (KIA). For search and destroy operations, as the objective was not to capture territory, victory was assessed by having a higher enemy body count.

== Overview ==
Since the goal of the United States in the Vietnam War was not to conquer North Vietnam but rather to ensure the survival of the South Vietnamese government, measuring progress was difficult. All the contested territory was theoretically "held" already. Instead, the U.S. Army used body counts to show that the U.S. was winning the war. The army's theory was that eventually the Viet Cong (VC) and People's Army of Vietnam (PAVN) would be unable to replace the losses caused by attrition warfare.

According to historian Christian Appy, "search and destroy was the principal tactic; and the enemy body count was the primary measure of progress" in General William Westmoreland’s war of attrition. "Search and destroy" was coined as a phrase in 1965 to describe missions aimed at flushing the VC out of hiding, while the body count was the measuring stick for the success of any operation. Since the early stages of the war did not seek to hold territory, assessments of whether an operation was considered a victory or not were entirely based on having a higher enemy killed ratio for U.S. commanders. The pressure to produce confirmed kills could result in massive fraud. Appy claims that U.S. commanders exaggerated body counts by 100 percent. A 1977 survey of 173 generals who served in Vietnam found that 61% of respondents "believed the body counts were 'grossly exaggerated'."

== Killing and counting of unarmed civilians ==
Historian Guenter Lewy estimated that around 220,000 civilians were killed during combat operations in South Vietnam, with more dying as a result of their wounds. For official U.S. military operations reports on free-fire zones, there are no distinctions between enemy KIA and civilian KIA since it was assumed by U.S. forces that all individuals killed in an area declared a free-fire zone, regardless of whether they were combatants or civilians, were considered enemy KIA. Since body counts were a direct measure of operational success, this often caused U.S. battle reports to list civilians killed as enemy KIA. Author Alex J. Bellamy wrote that the inclusion of civilians killed led to discrepancies between weapons seized and official body counts, noting that the official "enemy KIA" body count during Operation Speedy Express, was over 10,000 enemy KIA with only 748 weapons recovered. A U.S. Army Inspector General estimated that there were 5,000 to 7,000 civilian casualties from the operation. The My Lai massacre and Sơn Thắng massacre both initially reported women and children killed as "enemy combatants".

Former marine officer and later journalist Philip Caputo in the book A Rumor of War noted:

General Westmoreland's strategy of attrition also had an important effect on our behavior. Our mission was not to win terrain or seize positions, but simply to kill: to kill communists and as many of them as possible. Stack 'em like cordwood. Victory was a high body-count, defeat a low kill-ratio, war a matter of arithmetic. The pressure on unit commanders to produce enemy corpses was intense, and they in turn communicated it to their troops. This led to such practices as counting civilians as Viet Cong. "If it’s dead and Vietnamese, it's VC," was our rule of thumb in the bush. It is not surprising, therefore, that some men acquired a contempt for human life and predilection for taking it.

Christian Appy in Working Class War documents and describes some atrocities committed by U.S. forces. Civilian deaths from U.S. airstrikes were sometimes blamed on the PAVN/VC or claimed as "VC" casualties by U.S. forces in subsequent "Personnel Damage Assessments". Other reported incidents include ambushing or attacking unarmed groups of men such as fishermen or farmers, which were reported as "Viet Cong", as well as any civilians wearing black pajamas and civilians running away from helicopters, including women and children who were again reported as "enemy combatants" KIA. One notable example of this was the purported killing of hundreds of unarmed civilians by Tiger Force following grievous losses from a PAVN ambush, in which the unit proceeded to kill countless women, children and crippled individuals during Operation Wheeler/Wallowa. Journalist Jonathan Schell, who reported on Operation Cedar Falls, reported a general inability of U.S. forces to discern VC from unarmed civilians, based on tacit ignorance of the culture and the killing of civilians on whim or suspicion. During the operation he was told about numerous incidents including when a man riding a bicycle past a patrol near his town was shot and subsequently declared a VC, and the shooting of a woman carrying medical supplies, who was then declared an enemy combatant serving as a medic post-mortem.

British photojournalist Tony Swindell who had documented the conflict claimed that the murder of unarmed civilians who ran and claiming they were enemy combatants was common in the 11th Infantry Brigade, Americal Division prior to the unit becoming infamous for the My Lai massacre.

== Body count inflation ==
The junior officers surveyed in the 1970 "Study on Military Professionalism" had particularly strong reactions to questions regarding the body count. "They told of being given quotas and being told to go out and recount until they had sufficient numbers. 'Nobody out there believes the body count,' was the dominant response of the young combat arms officers."

In Lewis Sorley's book A Better War, he discusses the same study:

[B]ody count may have been the most corrupt – and corrupting – measure of progress in the whole mess. Certainly the consensus of senior Army leaders, the generals who commanded in Vietnam, strongly indicates that it was. Sixty-one percent, when polled on the matter, said the body count was "often inflated." Typical comments by the respondents were that it was 'a fake – totally worthless', that 'the immensity of the false reporting is a blot on the honor of the Army', and that "they were grossly exaggerated by many units primarily because of the incredible interest shown by people like McNamara and Westmoreland."

A potential cause of body count inflation was highlighted by David Hackworth who noted that fabrication was often caused by pressure from senior officers. This created an incentive for units to falsify metrics by including civilians in the count. Future Secretary of Defense Charles Hagel, who was then a sergeant in the division commanded by General Ewell, commented "You used that body count, commanding officers did, as the metric and measurement of how successful you were."

Deliberate falsification of enemy casualties was also done by senior leadership to create a false impression of success, including by General William Westmoreland. During the Battle of Dak To and the Battle of the Slopes, one company commander states after losing 78 men while finding 10 enemy bodies, the "enemy body count" figures were deliberately re-written as 475 by General Westmoreland and released as official operational reports.

== Estimates of PAVN/VC total casualties ==
The official U.S. Department of Defense figure was 950,765 communist forces killed in Vietnam from 1965 to 1974. Defense Department officials believed that these body count figures needed to be deflated by 30%, bringing it down roughly 660,000. The Ministry of Defense for Vietnam reported 849,018 military dead during the war for the period between 1955 and 1975 (of which a third were non-combat deaths). In addition, more than 300,000–330,000 PAVN/VC soldiers remain officially missing in action (their bodies were not found), with some estimates putting the number as high as 500,000. Sorley in A Better War cites Douglas Pike with a figure of 900,000 PAVN/VC dead and missing by 1973, and states that during a 1974 visit by Admiral Elmo Zumwalt to North Vietnam, PAVN General Võ Nguyên Giáp advised Zumwalt that the North had 330,000 missing. Geoffrey Ward and Ken Burns in the book The Vietnam War state over a million casualties were reported as well.

== See also ==
- McNamara fallacy § Body counts
- Michael D. Steele § Iron Triangle murders - allegations of similar body counts in Operation Iraqi Freedom
- List of snipers
