= Michael Klare =

American writer and academic

Michael T. Klare
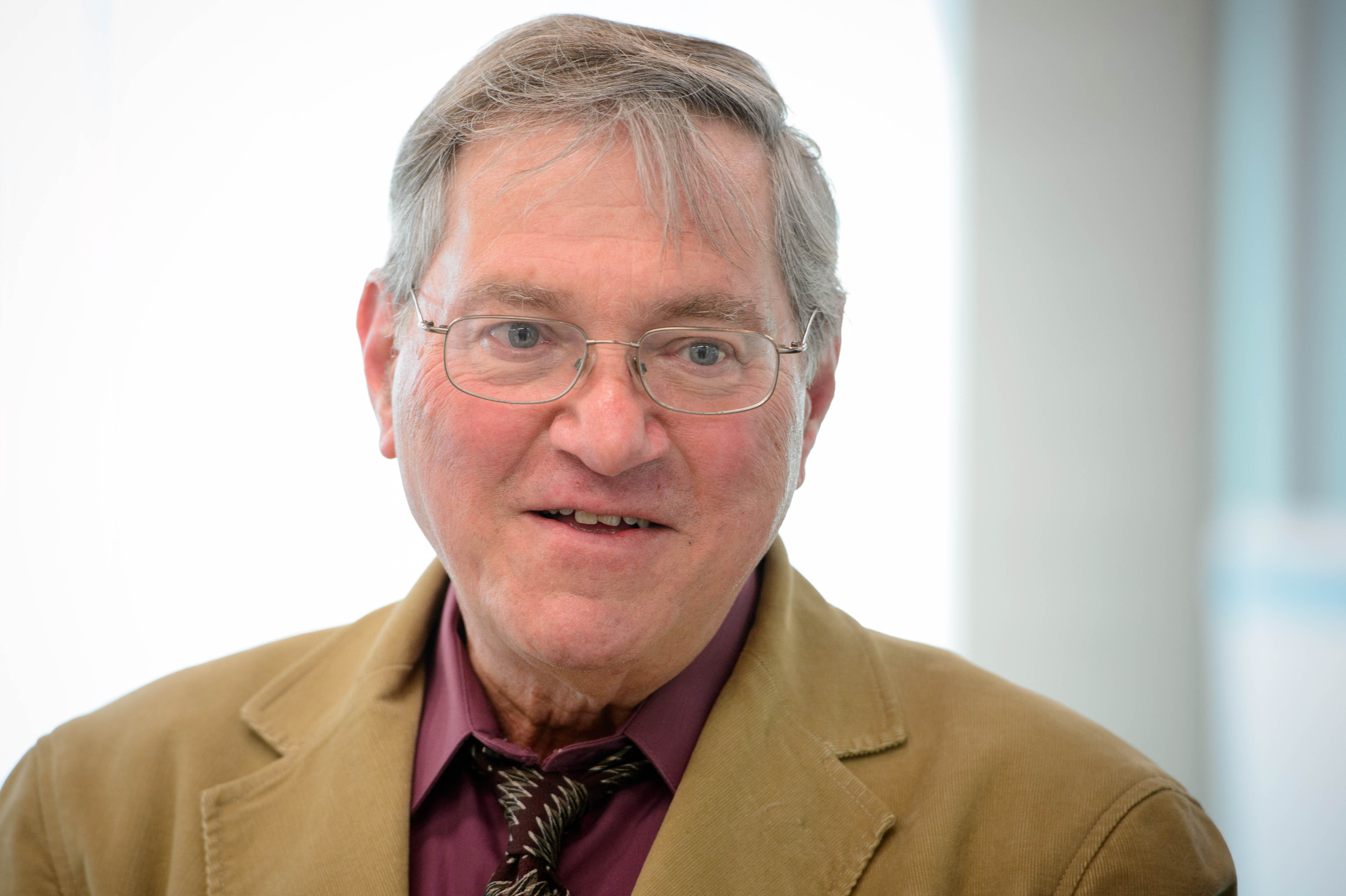
- Michael Klare in 2013
- Education: Columbia University (BA, MA); Union Institute & University (PhD)
- Writing career
- Subjects: U.S. defense policy, the arms trade, Peak oil, and world security affairs.

Michael T. Klare is a Five Colleges professor emeritus of Peace and World Security Studies, whose department is located at Hampshire College (Amherst, Massachusetts, USA), defense correspondent of The Nation magazine and author of Resource Wars and Blood and Oil: The Dangers and Consequences of America's Growing Petroleum Dependency (Metropolitan). His 2019 book is, All Hell Breaking Loose: the Pentagon's Perspective on Climate Change (Metropolitan). Klare also teaches at Amherst College, Smith College, Mount Holyoke College and the University of Massachusetts Amherst.

Klare serves on the board of directors of the Arms Control Association. He is a regular contributor to many publications including The Nation, TomDispatch and Mother Jones, and is a frequent columnist for Foreign Policy In Focus. He also was the narrator of the movie Blood and Oil, which was produced by the Media Education Foundation.

He lives in Northampton, Massachusetts. Klare is a graduate of Columbia University and the Union Institute & University.

== Geopolitics of oil ==
In November 2005, Klare alleged that a major factor motivating the George W. Bush administration to attack Iraq was its desire to distract attention from domestic political difficulties and to increase popularity for the President. US popular support for Bush increased by about 10% during the 2003 invasion of Iraq and only dropped back to its previous level several months later.

The movie Blood and Oil, which came out before the end of the Bush administration, explains Klare's view on oil as an instrument of national policy. Using sources including statements from official government sources and statements by media commentators, Klare pushes for alternative energy and warns that energy will be hard to get in the next century. The website for the movie describes the movie as follows:

The notion that oil motivates America's military engagements in the Middle East has long been dismissed as nonsense or mere conspiracy theory. Blood and Oil, a new documentary based on the critically-acclaimed work of Nation magazine defense correspondent Michael T. Klare, challenges this conventional wisdom to correct the historical record. The film unearths declassified documents and highlights forgotten passages in prominent presidential doctrines to show how concerns about oil have been at the core of American foreign policy for more than 60 years – rendering our contemporary energy and military policies virtually indistinguishable. In the end, Blood and Oil calls for a radical re-thinking of US energy policy, warning that unless we change direction, we stand to be drawn into one oil war after another as the global hunt for diminishing world petroleum supplies accelerates.

In a number of articles, Klare has commented on the future of oil. In an article published on March 13, 2012, he discussed "the principal cause of higher oil prices", concluding that "a fundamental shift in the structure of the oil industry" has occurred because of "the disappearance of relatively accessible and inexpensive petroleum", and that countries will have to grasp for the harder oil in the future. In another article, he continues this thesis and suggests that sanctions on Iran make not only Iranians suffer, but also those that buy oil from Iran. That same month, Klare noted the sensitive spots of conflict in the "Geo-energy era". They include the Strait of Hormuz, the East and South China Seas, the Caspian Sea basin, and the Arctic polar region. In another article in 2011, Klare expanded his thesis to something more radical. He noted that America and oil were falling together.

=== Extreme energy ===
Klare originated the concept of extreme energy. Extreme energy is a range of techniques for the production of energy from unconventional resources which share characteristics of being environmentally damaging or risky. Examples include exploitation of oil sands, tight oil (shale oil) and shale oil (oil from oil shale), deepwater drilling, hydraulic fracturing, mountaintop removal mining, petroleum exploration in the Arctic, and natural gas hydrates.

== Group of Three ==
Klare argued Group of Three of China, India, and the United States would increasingly shape the twenty-first century given the weakness of Russia displayed during the Russian invasion of Ukraine. These comments came in 2023, the same year the President of the World Economic Forum Borge Brende promoted the idea of a G-3.

== Bibliography ==
External videos
- Booknotes interview with Klare on Rogue States and Nuclear Outlaws, April 30, 1995, C-SPAN
- Presentation by Klare on Resource Wars, May 17, 2001, C-SPAN
- Presentation by Klare on Rising Powers, Shrinking Planet, April 17, 2008, C-SPAN
- Presentation by Klare on The Race for What's Left, March 20, 2012, C-SPAN

- War Without End: American Planning for the Next Vietnams (New York: Knopf, 1972). (Translations in Italian, Norwegian, and Spanish.)
- Supplying Repression (New York: Field Foundation, 1978). (2nd ed., with Cynthia Arnson, Institute for Policy Studies, Washington, D.C., 1981.)
- Beyond the 'Vietnam Syndrome': U.S. Interventionism in the 1980s (Washington, D.C.: Institute for Policy Studies, 1981).
- American Arms Supermarket (Austin: University of Texas Press, 1984).
- Low-Intensity Warfare: Counterinsurgency, Proinsurgency and Anti-terrorism in the Eighties, co-editor and contributor (New York: Pantheon, 1988).
- Peace and World Security Studies: A Curriculum Guide, 6th ed., editor and contributor (Boulder, CO: Lynne Rienner, 1994). (5th ed., co-editor and contributor, 1991).
- Lethal Commerce: The Global Trade in Small Arms and Light Weapons, co-editor and contributor (Cambridge, MA: American Academy of Arts and Sciences, 1995).
- Rogue States and Nuclear Outlaws: America's Search for a New Foreign Policy (New York: Hill & Wang, 1995).
- A Scourge of Guns: The Diffusion of Small Arms and Light Weapons in Latin America, with David Andersen (Washington, D.C.: Federation of American Scientists, 1996).
- World Security: Challenges for a New Century, 3rd ed., co-editor and contributor (New York: St. Martin's Press, 1998). (1st ed., co-editor and contributor, 1991; 2nd ed., co-editor and contributor, 1994.)
- Light Weapons and Civil Conflict, co-editor and contributor (Lanham, MD.: Rowman and Littlefield, 1999).
- Resource Wars: The New Landscape of Global Conflict (New York: Owl Books, reprint edition 2002).
- Blood and Oil: The Dangers and Consequences of America’s Growing Dependency on Imported Petroleum (New York: Metropolitan Books, 2004; paperback, Owl Books, 2005).
- (with Peter Kornbluh) Low Intensity Warfare: How the USA Fights Wars Without Declaring Them (Methuen Publishing Ltd, 1989, ISBN 0-413-61590-1).
- Rising Powers, Shrinking Planet: The New Geopolitics of Energy (Henry Holt & Company, Incorporated, 2008, ISBN 978-0-8050-8064-3).
- The Race for What's Left: The Global Scramble for the World's Last Resources, Metropolitan Books; First Edition (March 13, 2012), hardcover, 320 pages, ISBN 0805091262 ISBN 978-0805091267
- All Hell Breaking Loose: The Pentagon's Perspective on Climate Change, New York: Henry Holt and Co., 2019, ISBN 978-1-62779-248-6).

== Published articles ==
- Shopaholic China: chinadialogue July 2, 2010
- New Geopolitics
- "Michael Klare interviewed by Creel Commission" February 21, 2006. also at Jackalope Recordings
- "A Scourge of Small Arms," from Scientific American, June 2000 (with Jeffrey Boutwell).
- Archive of Michael Klare's articles in The Nation (1999–2006).
- Klare, Michael (January 1999). "The Kalashnikov age". Bulletin of the Atomic Scientists. 55 (1): 18–22. Bibcode:1999BuAtS..55a..18K. doi:10.2968/055001009.
- Klare, Michael (January–February 1997). "East Asia's militaries muscle up". Bulletin of the Atomic Scientists. 53 (1). Educational Foundation for Nuclear Science, Inc.: 56–61. Bibcode:1997BuAtS..53a..56K. doi:10.1080/00963402.1997.11456701. ISSN 0096-3402.
- "Rogue States and ‘Peer Competitors' - A New Military Strategy for Washington?" from Le Monde Diplomatique, November 1997.
