= Targeting Iran =

2013 film

- Directed by: Andy Norris
- Written by: Andy Norris
- Produced by: Andy Norris; Brent Streeper
- Starring: David Barsamian; Noam Chomsky; Vandana Shiva; Stephen Kinzer; Trita Parsi
- Release date: 2013
- Running time: 71 minutes
- Country: United States
- Language: English

Targeting Iran is a 2013 documentary film "designed to help Western audiences understand the complexities of historic and contemporary U.S./Iranian relations in an effort to derail potential military action." Based on the 2007 book of the same name by David Barsamian, the film "seeks to elucidate the myths and popular misconceptions surrounding Iran's nuclear aspirations."

== Production ==
Portland filmmaker Andy Norris approached Barsamian about making a film based on the book after seeing him give a reading at the Pine Grove Community House in Manzanita, Oregon in October 2007. Visual footage of contemporary Iran was provided by travel writer Rick Steves.

== Interviewees ==
- MIT's Jim Walsh
- Trita Parsi
- Noam Chomsky
- Dr. Vandana Shiva
- Stephen Kinzer
- David Barsamian
- Nahid Mozaffari
- Nazila Fathi

== Reception ==
Targeting Iran was included in the lineup of the 2013/2014 season of the Noor Iranian Film Festival.

=== Critical ===
Willamette Week gave the film a "Critic's Score" of 'C', saying "Targeting Iran is a classic case of TMI: Norris tries to pack a 272-page book into 71 minutes of film, and the resulting documentary starts to burst at the seams."

== See also ==
- Views on the nuclear program of Iran
