= Pepe Escobar =

Brazilian journalist (born 1954)

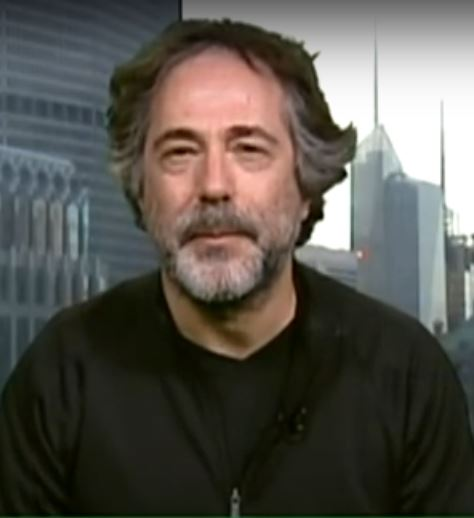
- Pepe Escobar on RT America in 2012
- Born: 1954 (age 71–72); São Paulo, Brazil
- Occupation: Journalist

Emilio "Pepe" Escobar (born 1954 in São Paulo) is a Brazilian journalist. He is known for his association with online alternative media, and his works have appeared in publications such as Asia Times, Mondialisation.ca, CounterPunch, Al-Jazeera, Press TV, Russia Today, Sputnik, Strategic Culture Foundation and Guancha.

He started as a music critic in Brazil where he has written for the newspapers Folha de S.Paulo, O Estado de S. Paulo and Gazeta Mercantil, the magazine CartaCapital, the online news portal Brasil 247 and has appeared as a commentator on TV 247.

In the late 1980s, he started working as a foreign correspondent and has since written about Asia, the Middle East, Russia and U.S. foreign policy. He served as a correspondent from Afghanistan and Pakistan during the War in Afghanistan, writing about Osama bin Laden before 9/11 and interviewing Afghan leader Ahmad Shah Massoud prior to his assassination. He coined the term "Pipelineistan" which refers to the network of oil and gas pipelines in crucial geopolitical regions, especially Central Asia. He suggests that Western actions in these areas are largely driven by a desire to reduce Europe's dependence on Russian energy and Western dependence on OPEC. This theory has faced criticism, particularly regarding its application to the Syrian civil war.

== Career ==
=== Music critic ===
Escobar initially became known in his native Brazil as a music critic covering the 1980s pop and punk music scene of São Paulo, reporting on bands such as Ira! for Folha de S.Paulo and O Estado de S. Paulo. His career at the newspapers ended in disgrace after accusations of plagiarism and other ethical controversies surfaced. Lúcio Ribeiro, a journalist for Folha de S. Paulo, stated in his column that Escobar was fired from the publication in 1987 after a review for the David Bowie album Let's Dance was revealed by André Vítor Singer to have been entirely plagiarized from a rock book published by the Rolling Stone magazine. Escobar justified the act as a tribute to the "game of mirrors" by Jorge Luis Borges. In the magazine Bizz, plagiarism was identified in an interview with Bryan Ferry, former leader of Roxy Music. In O Estado de S. Paulo, according to the newspaper's cultural critic Daniel Piza, Escobar invented from scratch an interview with filmmaker Roman Polanski that also led to his firing.

=== Foreign correspondent ===
Escobar next worked as a foreign correspondent and investigative journalist covering geopolitics. He has lived in London, Paris, Milan, Los Angeles, Washington, D.C., Bangkok and Hong Kong. He regularly wrote the column "The Roving Eye" for the Hong Kong-based Asia Times between 2010 and 2014.

Escobar reported from Afghanistan and Pakistan in the period around 2000–2001. In August 2000, the Taliban arrested Escobar and two other journalists and confiscated their film, accusing them of taking photos at a soccer match. On August 30, 2001, his column in Asia Times described the impact on US-Pakistani relations of the US campaign against Osama bin Laden - described as "the No 1 target of the CIA’s counterterrorism center": "inside Afghanistan today, where the Saudi Arabian lives in exile, Osama is a minor character. He is ill and always in hiding – usually "somewhere near Kabul." Once in a while he travels incognito to Peshawar. His organization, al-Qaeda, is split, and in tatters." The piece was called "prophetic" by KBOO. He interviewed Afghanistan's leading opposition commander against the Taliban, Ahmad Shah Massoud, for Asia Times weeks before his assassination on September 11. His October 26, 2001 piece for Asia Times, "Anatomy of a 'terrorist' NGO," described the history and methods of the Al Rashid Trust.

In 2011, journalist Arnaud de Borchgrave described Escobar as "well known for breaking stories in the Arab and Muslim worlds."

According to de Borchgrave, during the 2011 Libyan Civil War Escobar wrote a piece "uncovering" the background of Abdelhakim Belhaj (whose military leadership against Muammar Gaddafi was being aided by NATO), including his training with al-Qaeda in Afghanistan. According to Escobar's story, published by Asia Times on August 30, 2011, Belhaj's background was well known to Western intelligence.

Interviewed about his story by Radio New Zealand, Escobar said that Belhaj and his close associates were fundamentalists whose goal was to impose Islamic law once they defeated Gaddafi, and that Libya would slide into a civil war between Gaddafi loyalists and "Jihadist fundamentalists". Escobar's story was commented on by Muhammad Sahimi for PBS.

In 2014, Escobar participated in an international conference in Iran that also included several conspiracy theorists and Holocaust deniers. Journalist Gareth Porter said he would not have attended the event if he had known that some of the other participants held extremist views. Porter said that his representatives told him extremists would not be attending. He said that Escobar and Code Pink founder, Medea Benjamin, were equally upset by some of the presentations.

==== Pipelineistan ====
"Pipelineistan" is a term coined by Escobar to describe "the vast network of oil and gas pipelines that crisscross the potential imperial battlefields of the planet," from the Middle East to East Asia and particularly Central Asia. Articles by Escobar about his "Pipelineistan" theory, many first published in TomDispatch, were re-published in Al Jazeera, Grist, Mother Jones, and The Nation.

Escobar argued in a 2009 article published by CBS News that running energy pipelines from the energy-rich nations near the Caspian Sea would let Europe be less dependent on the natural gas that it currently gets from Russia, and would potentially help the West rely less on OPEC. This situation results in an international conflict of interest over the region. Escobar wrote that "The New Great Game of the twenty-first century is always over energy and it's taking place on an immense chessboard called Eurasia".

In 2018, Paul Cochrane in Middle East Eye dismissed the "Pipelineistan" theory put forward in Escobar's Al-Jazaeera piece, "that the bloodshed in Syria is simply another war over Middle Eastern energy resources". Cochrane wrote that covert action by the US against Syria started in 2005, which was before any plan was put forward to run a gas pipeline from Qatar to Syria. Robin Yassin-Kassab called it a "conspiracy theory". Naser Tamimi said "If Syria and Iraq stabilise, and political relations with Saudi Arabia and Iraq improve ... after all of that, then you could think of a pipeline. But at the end of the day it's a pipe dream". A 2021 study which examined data on Russia's intervention in Syria concluded that "Russian intervention has a distinct ‘dual logic’ aimed at integrating the interests of key regional actors into a transnational energy network, while stabilising Russia’s regional dominance within this network".

== Views and reception ==
=== Russia ===
Escobar has also been a commentator for RT.

In 2012, Jesse Zwick at The New Republic asked Escobar why he was willing to work with RT; Escobar replied, "I knew the Kremlin involvement, but I said, why not use it? After a few months, I was very impressed by the American audience. There are dozens of thousands of viewers. A very simple story can get 20,000 hits on YouTube. The feedback was huge.”

In a 2014 paper published by the European Council on Foreign Relations, Volodymyr Yermolenko wrote that Escobar was one of the "anti-Western intellectuals ... who suggest dividing Ukraine between Poland and Russia".

In the 2020s, according to the United States State Department's Global Engagement Center (GEC) several outlets that publish or republish work by Escobar are used by Russia for propaganda and disinformation. In 2020, the GEC stated that online journals, such as Strategic Culture Foundation, Globalresearch.ca, NewsFront, SouthFront, and New Eastern Outlook, where Escobar's work has appeared, acted as Russian fake news websites and are members of "Russia's disinformation and propaganda ecosystem." According to the GEC, "Pepe Escobar began writing articles for Global Research in 2005 and ten years later became an SCF author.

During the 2017 Catalan independence crisis, Escobar wrote that Spain lived in a state of permanent fascism.

According to a European People's Party document, in 2022,

Escobar [...] accused Joe Biden of being 'a puppet' of the American powers-that-be, including Hillary Clinton, who are driven by 'Russophobia' and 'confrontation with Russia by any means necessary with a single goal, to cut Russia off from the European economy'.

The Spanish newspaper ABC wrote that some of Escobar's writings were "the usual ones of Russian disinformation: 'Yankee' imperialism, NATO excesses, Russian victimization".

=== COVID-19 ===
According to Conspiracy Watch, Escobar has promoted discredited COVID-19 treatments and conspiracies around them, such as the use of drugs like chloroquine and hydroxychloroquine advocated by Didier Raoult.

== Bibliography ==
- Pepe Escobar (2007), Globalistan: How the Globalized World is Dissolving into Liquid War, Nimble Books.
- Pepe Escobar (2007), Red Zone Blues: A Snapshot of Baghdad During the Surge, Nimble Books.
- Pepe Escobar (2009), Obama Does Globalistan, Nimble Books.
- Pepe Escobar (2014), Empire of Chaos: The Roving Eye Collection, Nimble Books.
- Pepe Escobar (2015), 2030, Nimble Books.
- Pepe Escobar (2016), 2030, suivi de Dialogues inactuels (Jorge Luis Borges), Éditions du Cercle.
- Pepe Escobar (2024), Eurasia v. NATOstan, Nimble Books.
