= Imperial Ambitions =

2005 book by Noam Chomsky and David Barsamian

Imperial Ambitions: Conversations with Noam Chomsky on the Post-9/11 World
- Hardback book cover
- Author: Noam Chomsky
- Language: English
- Series: Interviews with David Barsamian
- Subject: Politics of the United States
- Publisher: Metropolitan Books
- Publication date: October 5, 2005
- Publication place: United States
- Media type: Print (Hardback)
- Pages: 240 pages
- ISBN: 978-0-241-14333-9
- OCLC: 60667860
- Preceded by: Propaganda and the Public Mind
- Followed by: What we Say Goes

Imperial Ambitions: Conversations with Noam Chomsky on the Post-9/11 World is a 2005 Metropolitan Books American Empire Project publication of interviews with American linguist and political activist Noam Chomsky conducted and edited by award-winning journalist David Barsamian of Alternative Radio.

In the interviews Chomsky offers his opinions on such topics as the occupation of Iraq, the doctrine of pre-emptive attack, and the threat to international peace posed by the U.S. drive for global domination, in which, according to Deirdre Fernand, writing in The Times, "He lambasts all forms of American colonisation."

This is the 6th volume is a series of interviews between Barsamian and Chomsky that began with the 1992 Common Courage Press publication Chronicles of Dissent and was preceded by the 2001 South End Press publication Propaganda and the Public Mind; it is the first collection of interviews with Chomsky since the 2001 Seven Stories Press publication 9-11.

The interviews in this volume were conducted between March 22, 2003, and February 8, 2005, for the most part in Chomsky's office at M.I.T. and had previously been published in part in International Socialist Review, Monthly Review, The Progressive, The Sun and Z Magazine.

== Contents ==
=== Introduction ===
In his introduction, written in Boulder, Colorado, in July 2005, Barsamian discusses what it is like to interview Chomsky, after having done so for the past 20 years, and states that, "It's to be in the presence of someone who insists that it's not so complicated to understand the truth or to know how to act." He goes on to conclude that, "it is my hope that the conversations in this book will spark thought, discussion, and, most of all, activism."

=== One: Imperial Ambitions ===
In this interview conducted in Cambridge, Massachusetts, on March 22, 2003, Chomsky begins by stating that the 2003 invasion of Iraq demonstrates a new doctrine he defines as preventative war where the U.S. moves to destroy any perceived challenge to its domination and in order to create this norm Saddam Hussein was falsely portrayed to the American people as a threat to their existence. If the establishment of a new regime in Iraq is successful he postulates that the U.S. will target other nations such as Venezuela or Iran in order to establish control over oil production and that the build-up to a U.S.-Turkish-Israeli invasion of Iran is already underway with the Israeli airforce flying reconnaissance missions from U.S. bases in Turkey and attempts to stir-up Azeri nationalist forces over the border. He adds however that this attack will only go ahead if Iran is perceived as unable to fight back and that this has encouraged Iran to undertake the development of nuclear weapons just as Iraq was encouraged to do so by the Israeli bombing of the Osirak reactor in 1981. He concludes by stating that anti-war protestors should not lose hope but prepare for the long haul like the abolitionist and civil rights movements did before.

=== Two: Collateral Language ===
In this interview conducted in Boulder, Colorado, on April 5, 2003, Chomsky begins by musing on the progress of co-ordinated propaganda efforts first used by the British government and later U.S. President Woodrow Wilson to gain the backing of the American public for joining the First World War, then by Edward Bernays and Walter Lippmann in the 1920s to turn the on-job control of Taylorism into the off-job control, and in the elitist policies of Harold Laswell in the 1930s that had their origins in the Madisonian Model and would re-appear in Adolf Hitler's Mein Kampf, before moving largely into the private sector with the abolition of U.S. President Ronald Reagan's Office of Public Diplomacy in the 1980s. He sees Karl Rove as the inheritor of this legacy with the instigation of a campaign to instil fear in the American populace with false claims about Iraq and portray George W. Bush as their saviour, so that they will accept a domestic policy that goes against their own interests. He postulates that there is a propensity for fear particular to U.S. culture, possibly related to the country's history, that makes the American people especially susceptible to this form of propaganda and that it is necessary for them to develop an attitude of critical examination in order to overcome this.

=== Three: Regime Change ===
In this interview conducted in Cambridge, Massachusetts, on September 11, 2003, Chomsky begins by outlining the U.S's long standing policy of instigating regime change back to the 1953 Iranian coup and then compares Iraq's U.S. installed regime, under Paul Bremer, with that the British government installed after the First World War under the direction Lord Curzon, highlighting the similarities in both cases of a foreign nation assuming real power behind an Iraqi façade. He states that the drive for resources is an important factor in U.S's imperialist policies but not the only one and that whilst North Korea was a tempting target due to its strategic location amidst the developing economies of Northeast Asia it had a deterrent (artillery pointed at Seoul) that Iraq lacked and goes on to point out that imperialist occupation is actually quite costly although these costs are in effect gifts from the taxpayers to private corporations like Bechtel and Halliburton. He agrees with Indian politician Jawaharlal Nehru's suggestion that imperialism is inherently racist but points out that it is necessary for supporters of imperialism to bestow their arguments with a moral basis (pointing to historical examples such as John Stuart Mill) and claims that now Michael Ignatieff and other American intellectuals are doing it for American imperialism but the general public in the U.S. should ignore these apologists and speak the truth.

=== Four: Wars of Aggression ===
In this interview conducted in Cambridge, Massachusetts, on February 12, 2004, Chomsky starts by responding to Robert McNamara's comments about the World War II firebombing of Tokyo in The Fog of War by pointing out that definition of a war crime at the Nuremberg Trials was anything the enemy did that the Allies didn't do and goes on to point out that this logic is central to the Bush doctrine. One of the key crimes prosecuted at the Trials was that of waging a war of aggression but Chomsky claims that the U.S. invasion of Iraq is the latest in a series of aggressive wars lead or backed by the U.S. that have not been legally questioned as the U.S. sets the law rather than follows it. He cites polls that state the majority of Iraqis view the U.S. forces as occupiers and points out that Iraqis have a far better understanding of imperialism than the Western media, which criticises the implementation but not the basis of the invasion; noting that Iraq's current borders were artificially created in 1920 under the Mandate for Mesopotamia. He concludes that the U.S. and Israel's shortsighted stockpiling and development of nuclear weapons spurs proliferation and terrorism so that even if Iraq was found to have weapons of mass destruction it would still not justify the invasion.

=== Five: History and Memory ===
In this interview conducted in Cambridge, Massachusetts, on June 11, 2004, Chomsky begins by relating the bloody history of El Salvador in the 1980s under a military junta supported by U.S. President Reagan and his 'proconsul' John Negroponte, who with this history effaced was then being sent to Iraq, and goes on to discuss other actions of the administration including the invasions of Grenada and Nicaragua that have been effaced by a post 1992 propaganda campaign. He uses the example of the 1954 Guatemalan coup d'état to highlight the role of the Central Intelligence Agency and the complicity of the media in this propaganda, which he claims is necessary for the public to allow the things done in its name and that public opposition back home resultant from the failure of this propaganda on Iraq was the reason for the recent restraint of U.S. forces in Falluja. He concludes that while it was the Reagan administration that funded and trained the militants that would later develop in Al-Qaeda it was the Clinton administration's cruise missile attacks on Afghanistan and Sudan that turned them into anti-Western symbols and the actions of the George W. Bush administration that intensified their terrorist activities and that the only real difference between presidential candidates John Kerry and George W. Bush would be with regard to domestic policy.

=== Six: The Doctrine of Good Intentions ===
In this interview conducted in Cambridge, Massachusetts, on November 30, 2004, Chomsky begins by dismissing the false conflict between Wilsonian idealism and hard-headed realism, which has become standard story in scholarship and the media regarding U.S. foreign policy and goes on to compare the invasion of Iraq with the Vietnam War, both of which are said to have been mistakes undertaken with the best of intentions. He goes on to dismiss the concept of a Vietnam Syndrome and claims that while the U.S.'s maximal objectives were not achieved it still achieved a substantial victory by ensuring that the country did not become a model for its neighbours. Such false conceptions, he claims, allow the U.S. to get away with major war crimes such as the 2004 occupation of the general hospital in Falluja and the turning back of civilians fleeing the city as the media focuses on minor war crimes committed by individual soldiers or units in the field, such as the My Lai massacre, whilst ignoring the greater war crimes of the planners in Washington, D.C. He concludes by opposing the concept of an all-volunteer army as this amounts to a mercenary army of the disadvantaged whilst the draft encourages more civilising ties to the citizen culture to which he attributes in part the failure of U.S. Imperial aims in Vietnam.

=== Seven: Intellectual Self-Defense ===
In this interview conducted in Cambridge, Massachusetts, on December 3, 2004, Chomsky begins by stating that his analysis work is largely the detailed routine of finding and decoding the internalised assumptions of the educated elite and highlights this indoctrinated bias with the example of the attack on Social Security, which, he claims, is intended to undermine solidarity and atomise the population so that they are easy to control. He points out that the elite media (e.g., BBC and New York Times) and the business press (e.g., Wall Street Journal and Financial Times) have a duty to report the facts to their primary constituency (economical, political and doctrinal managers) and all he has to do is deconstruct the doctrinal slant to discover the truth. These techniques of intellectual self-defense are, he claims, essential for people to understand their power over governments, which relies on their consent to govern and he uses the example of the changing role of women in modern society to demonstrate how the questioning of these underlying biases can lead to real social change. He concludes that these movements do not necessarily have to come from the oppressed but in fact oppressors who realise their guilt and more importantly attempt to do something about it can be even more effective.

=== Eight: Democracy and Education ===
In this interview conducted in Lexington, Massachusetts, on February 7, 2005, Chomsky begins by reminiscing about his early education in a Deweyite school and his relationship with his father, a Hebrew scholar, who first introduced him to Semitic linguistics. He goes on to recall his subsequent disappointment with the academic discipline of high school and college, which he only continued with under the influence of Zellig Harris, who ran the linguistics department at the University of Pennsylvania. He states that the academically unprestigious school allowed him an intellectual freedom that worked to his advantage but which means he is mostly self-educated with no formal training in any field, including linguistics. He rejects the use of labels but accepts that he is an old fashioned conservative in regard to his taste in music, literature and classical liberal doctrines with political views that grow out of the anarcho-syndicalist tradition. He states that he finds the threatening of Enlightenment ideals by extremist religious beliefs a very worrisome feature of U.S. culture that is unique amongst industrial countries and has undermined democracy. He concludes that his goal in teaching and research has been to understand something about the human mind whilst his goal in activism has been to help people become engaged in overcoming human suffering.

=== Nine: Another World is Possible ===
In this interview conducted in Lexington, Massachusetts, on February 8, 2005, Chomsky begins by stating that the U.S. has been a deeply religious country since its settlement by fundamentalists and that the typical inverse correlation between extremist religious belief and industrialization breaks down in this case. He states that since U.S. President Jimmy Carter there has been a conscious takeover of the electoral system by the public relations industry, which sells candidates as Bible-fearing evangelical Christians, and that this process can be observed in other aspects of American life as an undeniable aspect of U.S. exceptionalism, which he attributes in part to the country's strong sense of insecurity. He then turns his attention to the planning of the U.S. economy, which he claims has over the preceding 30 years shifted to benefit the corporations and the superrich at the cost of the general population and future generations. He theorises that economists have highly ideological ways of measuring costs which by concentrating on productivity shifts costs to the consumer creating what is in actuality an extremely inefficient system as a whole. He concludes that the U.S. is a failed state with basic institutions that are totally illegitimate, but he hopes one-day it will become as democratic as Brazil or Haiti.

== Reviews ==
David Swanson writing in Political Affairs Magazine commends Barsamian for consistently asking "penetrating and provocative questions", and states that this book is an "ideal place to start" for readers not familiar with Chomsky whilst those that are will still be surprised by his "analyses of recent events".

Swanson comments on Chomsky's philosophical background but states that this book "contains none of Chomsky the philosopher"; rather it is "purely the political activist", and when he "turns to politics he forswears not only pretentious language but also metaphysical theories of history" so that in these interviews he "is completely down to earth and pragmatic".

Swanson references Chomsky's example of the Mexican ambassador's comment to U.S. President Kennedy that "If we publicly declare that Cuba is a threat to our security, forty million Mexicans will die laughing" in his concluding comment that "The danger in reading Chomsky is that millions of Americans will die laughing every time they turn on their televisions."

The reviewer in the South China Morning Post also comments on the plain language in these interviews commenting that "Those who have tackled Chomsky's latest book, Hegemony or Survival, may be excused for thinking otherwise, but Barsamian's skilful editing makes [him] accessible."

Laurence Phelan writing in The Independent also comments on this and goes on to state that, "These transcripts find [Chomsky] in a sprightly and sometimes even playful mood, able to draw upon a seemingly encyclopedic knowledge of world affairs and history, making connections, alighting on unexpected topics of conversation and arguing with persuasive logic."

Barry Weisleder writing in Socialist Voice also makes comparisons to Chomsky's Hegemony or Survival, stating that the "'fast flowing dialog" in these interviews "traces some of the same ground", "but delves more into strategic questions, though not always rewardingly", and goes on to criticise "the extreme limitation of his outlook", which "is the tragedy that dulls the brilliance of Chomsky's body of work".
