= Ira A. Hunt Jr. =

United States Army general (1924–2022)

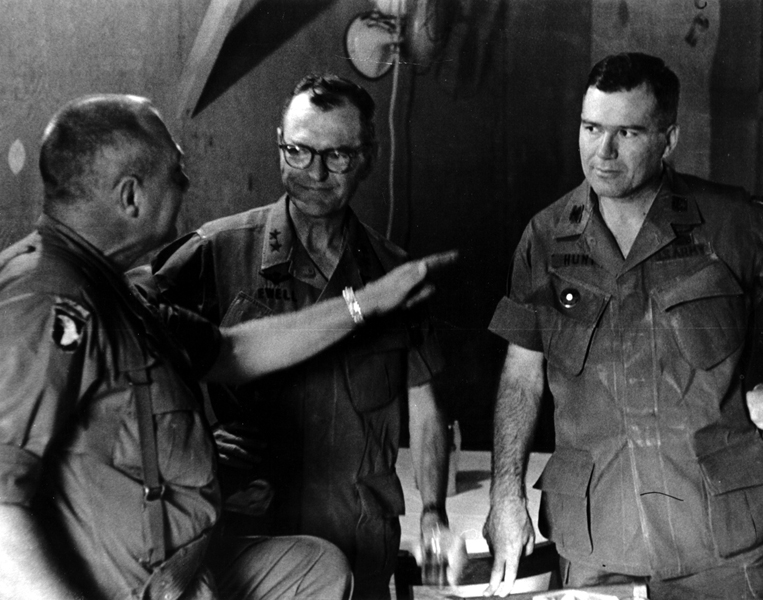
- Col. John Geraci, Major General Julian Ewell and Hunt c.1968
- Born: July 23, 1924; Lincoln, Nebraska, U.S.
- Died: May 23, 2022 (aged 97); Fairfax County, Virginia, U.S.
- Military career
- Allegiance: United States of America
- Branch: United States Army
- Service years: 1945–1978
- Rank: Major General
- Commands: 1st Brigade, 9th Infantry Division; 12th Engineer Battalion
- Conflicts: Vietnam War
- Awards: Silver Star (2); Legion of Merit (4); Distinguished Flying Cross; Distinguished Service Medal (2)

Ira Augustus Hunt Jr. (July 23, 1924 – May 23, 2022) was a United States Army Major General.

== Early life and education ==
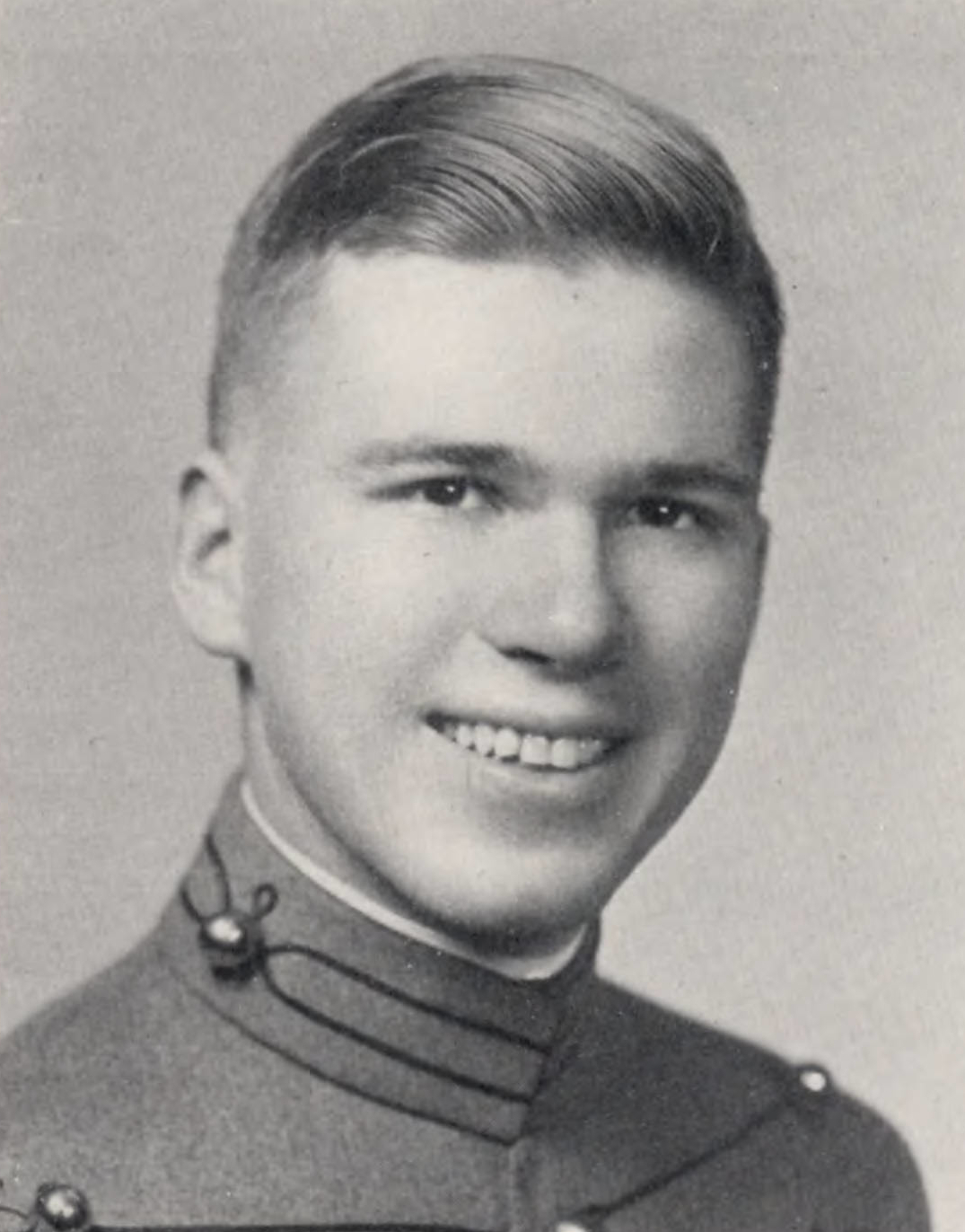
Hunt as a West Point cadet c. 1945

Ira Augustus Hunt Jr. was born in Lincoln, Nebraska on July 23, 1934. He attended the United States Military Academy graduating in the class of 1945.

== Military career ==
Hunt was assigned to the Corps of Engineers upon graduation. He served as a commander of the 12th Engineer Battalion, 8th Infantry Division in West Germany from 1964 to 1966. He later served as a Military Assistant in the Office of Organization and Management Planning, Office of the Secretary of Defense.

During the Vietnam War he served as Chief of Staff of the 9th Infantry Division under Major General Julian Ewell. He subsequently served as commander of the 1st Brigade, 9th Infantry Division.

Hunt served as deputy commander of United States Support Activities Group from 1973 to 1974 and served temporarily as Defense Attaché at the Defense Attaché Office, Saigon during a change of command in August 1974.

Hunt served as Deputy Chief of Staff for Training and Schools, Headquarters, United States Army Training and Doctrine Command, Fort Monroe, Virginia.

== Writing ==
Hunt was the author of several books on the Vietnam War:

- Sharpening the combat edge: The use of analysis to reinforce military judgment (1974) with LTG Julian Ewell
- The 9th Infantry Division in Vietnam: Unparalleled and Unequaled (2010) ISBN 9780813126470
- Losing Vietnam: How America Abandoned Southeast Asia (2013) ISBN 9780813142081
- My Lai Cover-Up Deceit and Incompetence (2018) ISBN 9780998685144

== Personal life and death ==
Ira A. Hunt Jr. retired from the Army in 1978. He died in Fairfax County, Virginia on May 23, 2022, at the age of 97.

== Decorations ==
His decorations included the Silver Star (2), the Legion of Merit (4), the Distinguished Flying Cross and the Distinguished Service Medal (2).
