= Julian Ewell =

United States Army officer

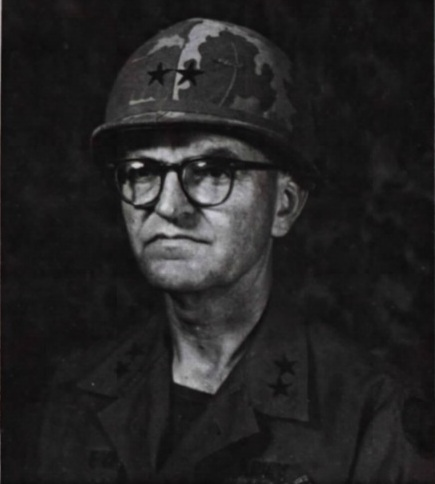
- Ewell in 1968
- Born: November 5, 1915; Stillwater, Oklahoma
- Died: July 27, 2009 (aged 93); Fairfax, Virginia
- Burial place: Arlington National Cemetery
- Military career
- Allegiance: United States
- Branch: United States Army
- Service years: 1939–1973
- Rank: Lieutenant General
- Commands: II Field Force; 9th Infantry Division; 9th Infantry Regiment; 501st Parachute Infantry Regiment; 3rd Battalion, 501st Parachute Infantry Regiment
- Conflicts: World War II; Korean War; Vietnam War
- Awards: Distinguished Service Cross; Army Distinguished Service Medal (4); Silver Star (3); Legion of Merit (2); Bronze Star Medal; Purple Heart; Air Medal

Lieutenant General Julian Johnson Ewell (November 5, 1915 – July 27, 2009) was a United States Army officer who served in World War II, the Korean War, and the Vietnam War. He commanded the 9th Infantry Division and II Field Force in South Vietnam, and attained the rank of lieutenant general. The son of a career Army officer, Ewell graduated from the New Mexico Military Institute and the United States Military Academy.

Commissioned as a second lieutenant of infantry in 1939, he volunteered for paratrooper training at the start of World War II. During the war, he commanded 3rd Battalion, 501st Parachute Infantry Regiment, part of the 101st Airborne Division. He took part in a parachute jump into Normandy during the D-Day invasion, and continued to take part in combat against the Nazis in Europe. Ewell later commanded the 501st Regiment, which included participation in Operation Market Garden and the defense of Bastogne in the Battle of the Bulge. He received the Distinguished Service Cross for his heroism at Bastogne.

Following the war's end in 1945, Ewell continued his Army career, and his command assignments included the 9th Infantry Regiment in South Korea during the Korean War, Assistant Commandant of Cadets at West Point, Assistant Division Commander of the 8th Infantry Division, and Deputy Commander and Chief of Staff for the Combat Developments Command. During the Vietnam War, Ewell commanded the 9th Infantry Division (1968–1969) and II Field Force (1969–1970). He later served as military advisor to the U.S.-South Vietnamese delegation at the negotiations for the Paris Peace Accords and Chief of Staff of the NATO Southern Command.

Ewell's Vietnam service generated controversy, especially over concerns that his focus on "body counts" as a measure of success led to his subordinates inflating their numbers by counting civilian dead as enemy combatants. The most well-known operation he commanded was Operation Speedy Express. Out of an official enemy "body count" of 11,000, an internal Department of Defense report estimated that there may have been up to 7,000 civilian casualties. This earned him the nickname the "Butcher of the Delta" among soldiers of the 9th Division. Ewell was apparently proud of this nickname and saw nothing wrong with what the soldiers under his command had done. Ewell died in Virginia in 2009, and was buried at Arlington National Cemetery.

== Early life and start of career ==
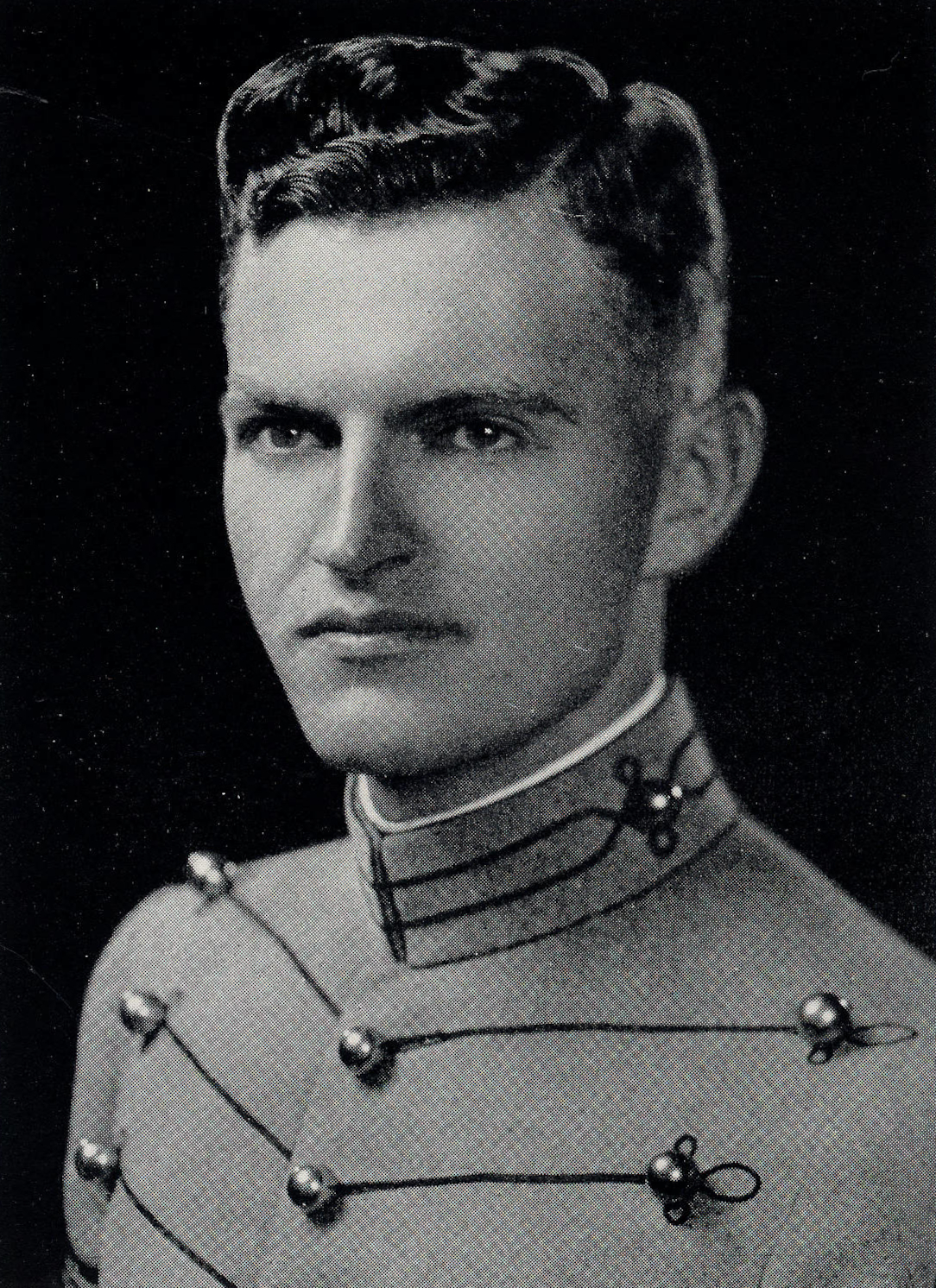
Ewell as a West Point cadet in 1939

Julian Johnson Ewell was the son of Jammie Morrison (Offutt) Ewell and Colonel George W. Ewell (1879–1972), a career Army officer. He was born in Stillwater, Oklahoma on November 5, 1915, while his father was serving as a Reserve Officer Training Corps instructor at Oklahoma Agricultural and Mechanical College (now Oklahoma State University–Stillwater). He was raised in California, Panama, Pennsylvania and Washington, D.C., and graduated from New Mexico Military Institute in 1932. He attended Duke University before transferring to the United States Military Academy, from which he graduated in 1939. He received his commission as a Second Lieutenant of Infantry, and received paratrooper training at the start of World War II.

=== Military education ===
General Ewell was a graduate of the United States Army Command and General Staff College (1946), United States Army War College (1952) and National War College (1959).

== World War II ==
Having advanced to lieutenant colonel during the war, Ewell assumed command of 3rd Battalion, 501st Parachute Infantry Regiment, part of the 101st Airborne Division. In June 1944, Ewell parachuted into Normandy and led his men into combat for the first time. Despite being unable to immediately account for a majority of his battalion because so many paratroopers had missed their landing zones, Ewell was still able to regroup and engage the German defenses.

On September 17, 1944, Ewell's battalion parachuted into the Netherlands as part of Operation Market Garden and Ewell soon moved up to regimental executive officer. With the death of 501st commander Colonel Howard R. Johnson on October 8, Ewell moved up to regimental command.

That winter, he commanded the 501st when the 101st Airborne Division was rushed into the emergency defense of Bastogne in the Battle of the Bulge, and received the Distinguished Service Cross for his heroic actions.

== Korean War ==
Ewell continued his service after World War II. As a colonel in the late 1940s he served as executive officer to General Maxwell Taylor during Taylor's command of U.S. forces in Berlin. In 1953, he was assigned as commander of the 9th Infantry Regiment in South Korea.

== Vietnam War ==
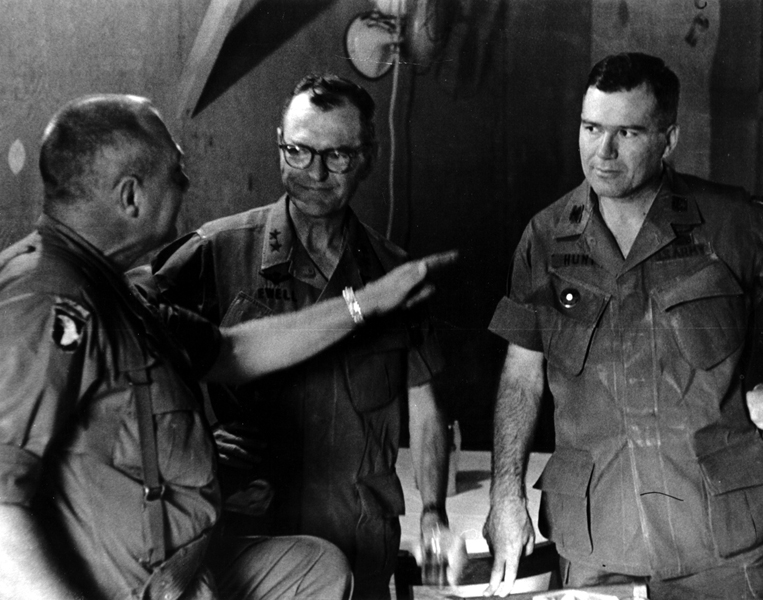
Ewell (center) listens to 1st Brigade commander Colonel John Geraci while Colonel Ira A. Hunt Jr., the 9th Infantry Division chief of staff, stands to the right.

After the Korean War, Ewell attained the rank of brigadier general, and his assignments included: Assistant Commandant of Cadets at West Point; Executive Assistant to General Taylor during Taylor's assignment as Military Aide to President John F. Kennedy and Chairman of the Joint Chiefs of Staff; Assistant Division Commander of the 8th Infantry Division; Chief of Staff of V Corps in West Germany; and Deputy Commander and Chief of Staff for Combat Developments Command.

From 1968 to 1969, Ewell commanded the 9th Infantry Division as a major general. During his command, the division carried out Operation Speedy Express, an effort to eliminate Viet Cong and North Vietnamese soldiers with overwhelming force.

From 1969 to 1970, Ewell commanded II Field Force in Vietnam, receiving promotion to lieutenant general.

After relinquishing command of II Field Force, Ewell was military advisor to the U.S.-South Vietnamese delegation at the negotiations for the Paris Peace Accords.

=== Vietnam War controversy ===
Critics have charged Ewell with focusing obsessively on "body counts" during the Vietnam War, causing his subordinates to inflate their numbers in an effort to demonstrate success by counting civilian dead as enemy combatants and committing atrocities. David Hackworth, author of Steel my Soldiers' Hearts, was critical of Ewell's performance. Hackworth, who served in the 9th Division during the Vietnam War, wrote that in 1968 and 1969 the division was credited with killing 20,000 enemy, yet recovered only 2,000 weapons, suggesting that the numbers of enemy dead were inflated. John Paul Vann estimated that of those killed in the Delta were, "at least 30 percent were noncombatants". According to Hackworth, Ewell's focus on body counts earned him the nickname the "Butcher of the Delta" from members of the 9th Division.

During Speedy Express, the 9th Division claimed an official enemy body count of 10,899 enemies killed but only 748 weapons captured. A 1972 Inspector General report concluded that "While there appears to be no means of determining the precise number of civilian casualties incurred by US forces during Operation Speedy Express, it would appear that the extent of these casualties was indeed substantial, and that a fairly solid case can be constructed to show that civilian casualties may have amounted to several thousand (between 5,000 and 7,000)."

In a 2008 article in The Nation, reporter Nick Turse, references a VC report released in December 1969, which stated that during the operation between 1 December 1968, and 1 April 1969, the US military "mopped up many areas, slaughtering 3,000 people, mostly old folks, women and children, and destroying thousands of houses, hundreds of hectares of fields and orchards."

In 1974, Ewell and Ira A. Hunt Jr., a major general who had served as Ewell's Chief of Staff in the 9th Division, authored Sharpening the Combat Edge. In their book, Ewell and Hunt argued that the allegations of obsession with the body count were unfounded, and that their effort to inflict maximum damage had "unbrutalized" the war for civilians in South Vietnam.

Ewell and Hunt's views are countered in Nick Turse's book, Kill Anything That Moves: The Real American War in Vietnam. Turse argues that Ewell's tactics amounted to war crimes and asserts that a coverup of Speedy Express went to the top of American decision-making in Vietnam. Turse argues that most accounts attempt to minimize the viciousness and unethical behavior shown by some American commanders and soldiers in Vietnam.

== Post-Vietnam War ==
From 1972 until his 1973 retirement, Ewell was Chief of Staff of NATO's Allied Forces Southern Europe in Naples, Italy.

== Awards ==
In addition to the Distinguished Service Cross, General Ewell's awards and decorations included: the Distinguished Service Medal (4); Silver Star (3); Legion of Merit (2); Bronze Star; Purple Heart; Air Medal; and Combat Infantryman Badge. He was also a recipient of several foreign decorations, including the Legion of Honor (Chevalier) from France.

=== Citation for Distinguished Service Cross ===
The President of the United States takes pleasure in presenting the Distinguished Service Cross to Julian J. Ewell (0–21791), Lieutenant Colonel (Infantry), U.S. Army, for extraordinary heroism in connection with military operations against an armed enemy while serving as Commanding Officer, 501st Parachute Infantry Regiment, 101st Airborne Division, in action against enemy forces on the night of 18–19 December 1944, at Bastogne, Belgium. In the darkness of 18–19 December 1944, Colonel Ewell's regiment was the first unit of the 101st Airborne Division to reach the vicinity of Bastogne, Belgium, then under attack by strong enemy forces. While his regiment assembled, Lieutenant Colonel Ewell went forward alone to Bastogne to obtain first hand enemy information. During the night of 18–19 December 1944, Lieutenant Colonel Ewell made a personal reconnaissance amid intermingled friendly and hostile troops and on 19 December, by his heroic and fearless leadership of his troops, contributed materially to the defeat of enemy efforts to prostrate Bastogne. On 3 January 1945, when an enemy attack threatened to blunt the impetus of the regimental offensive, Lieutenant Colonel Ewell personally lead a counterattack which stopped the enemy and made possible the continued offensive action of his regiment. Throughout the action at Bastogne, the heroic and fearless personal leadership of Lieutenant Colonel Ewell were a source of inspiration to the troops he commanded. His intrepid actions, personal bravery and zealous devotion to duty exemplify the highest traditions of the military forces of the United States and reflect great credit upon himself, the 101st Airborne Division, and the United States Army.

Headquarters, XVIII Airborne Corps, General Orders No. 19 (March 14, 1945) Hometown: Washington, D.C.

== Ewell's memorabilia ==
World War II memorabilia from Ewell is on display at the December 44 Museum in La Gleize, a facility which commemorates the Battle of the Bulge.

== Retirement, death and burial ==
In retirement, General Ewell lived in the Fairfax Retirement Community at Fort Belvoir, Virginia. He died at Inova Fairfax Hospital in Fairfax on July 27, 2009. He was buried at Arlington National Cemetery, Section 59, Grave 3854.

== Family ==
General Ewell was married four times. His first two marriages, to Mary Gillem and Jean Hoffman, resulted in divorces. He was married to his third wife, Beverly Mccammon Moses, for forty years before her death in 1995. In 2005, he married Patricia Gates Lynch. Ewell had two children and two stepchildren.
