= Elite media =

The term elite media refers to newspapers, radio stations, TV channels, and other media that are deemed to serve a political or economic elite and influence the political agenda of other mass media. According to Noam Chomsky’s Propaganda Model, "[t]he elite media set a framework within which others operate”.

The term can have different meanings depending on political ideology e.g.The New York Times is used as an example of elite media in the context of a criticism of class society and corporate hierarchy by Chomsky, an anarchist intellectual, while conservative Bill O'Reilly, uses the term to identify liberals with elites while associating the right, including wealthy businessmen, with the interests of common people.

Conservatives often use "Elite media" or "Media elite" in a pejorative context, alleging that the reporting is biased and untrustworthy—-associating liberalism with elites who, unlike conservatives, have disdain for working-class needs and values.

== See also ==
- Academic elitism
- Liberal elite
- Media studies
- Noam Chomsky
- Media cross-ownership in the United States
