= Vietnam War Crimes Working Group =

Pentagon task force set up in the wake of the My Lai Massacre

The Vietnam War Crimes Working Group (VWCWG) was a Pentagon task force set up in the wake of the My Lai massacre and its media disclosure. The goal of the VWCWG was to attempt to ascertain the veracity of emerging claims of war crimes and atrocities by U.S. armed forces in Vietnam allegedly committed during the Vietnam War period.

The investigation compiled over 9,000 pages of investigative files, sworn statements by witnesses and status reports for top military officers, indicating that 320 alleged incidents had factual basis.

== Working Group Files ==
The group's files document 320 alleged incidents that were substantiated by United States Army investigators—not including the 1968 My Lai massacre. The documents are housed by the United States National Archives and Records Administration (NARA) and were declassified in the mid-1990s. Journalists such as Nick Turse and Deborah Nelson have written about the files, using them to assert that such atrocities were more widespread than had been officially acknowledged.

=== Declassification and access ===
In 1990 Kali Tal, the editor of a small-circulation journal called Vietnam Generation, was tipped off to the existence of the Vietnam Working Group records by an archivist at NARA. She sent in a Freedom of Information Act (FOIA) request and eventually received access to some of the records in 1992. After viewing them, she wrote a brief article about their content in a Vietnam Generation newsletter, but did not have the resources to pursue the matter. The records were declassified in 1994, after 20 years as required by the FOIA, and relocated to the National Archives in College Park, Maryland, where they went largely unnoticed.

In 2001, freelance journalist Nick Turse rediscovered the VWCWG archive while researching his doctoral dissertation for the Center for the History and Ethics of Public Health at Columbia University. He managed to examine most of the files, and obtained copies of about 3,000 pages—representing roughly a third of the total—before government officials removed them from the public shelves in 2002, stating they contained personal information that was exempt from the FOIA.

== Los Angeles Times exposure ==
Nick Turse collaborated with Deborah Nelson, a former staff writer and current Washington D.C. investigative editor for the Los Angeles Times, to employ these documents to form the core of a series of articles. They were augmented by Army Inspector-General records in the National Archives; FBI and Army Criminal Investigation Division (CID) records; documents shared by military veterans; and case files and related records in the Col. Henry Tufts Archive at the University of Michigan; as well as interviews with participants, witnesses, survivors and former Army officials in both the United States and Vietnam.

While the archive contains 320 substantiated incidents, the records also contain allegations of more than 500 atrocities that investigators could not prove or were otherwise discounted. At 9,000 pages, the archive is the largest collection of such documents to have surfaced to date. It includes investigation files, sworn statements by witnesses and status reports for senior military officers.

In total, the documents describe a seemingly endemic violent minority within U.S. Army units throughout the Southeast Asian theater during this period, in contrast to the official picture of "rogue units", with widespread duplicity at various levels of the command structure. This official documentation lends credence to widespread anecdotal evidence as presented by unofficial investigations of the time, such as the Russell Tribunal, the National Veterans Inquiry, the Citizens Commission of Inquiry, and the Winter Soldier Investigation.

They also were used for a book by Nelson entitled The War Behind Them, which includes stories about how the interviews were conducted, transcripts, and descriptions of travels to Vietnam for further investigations. One interviewee was Lawrence Wilkerson, who described the situation surrounding 'free fire zones'.

== Partial list of substantiated cases ==
- Seven previously unacknowledged massacres from 1967 through 1971 in which at least 137 civilians died.
- Seventy-eight other attacks on noncombatants in which at least 57 were killed, 56 wounded and 15 sexually assaulted.
- One hundred forty-one instances in which U.S. soldiers tortured civilian detainees or prisoners of war with fists, sticks, bats, water or electric shock (sometimes using Field telephones).

Two hundred and three soldiers accused of harming Vietnamese civilians or prisoners were found to warrant formal charges after investigation, and were subsequently referred to the soldiers' superiors for official action. Of the 203 cases, 57 of them stood a court martial. Only 23 were convicted, of whom 14 received prison sentences ranging from six months to 20 years; most received significant reductions on appeal. Many substantiated cases were closed with a letter of reprimand, a fine or, in more than half the cases, no action at all.

The stiffest sentence went to a military intelligence interrogator convicted of committing indecent acts on a 13-year-old girl in an interrogation hut in 1967. The records show that he served seven months of a 20-year term.

== Preventing communication to Congress ==
The VWCWG also tried to intercept communications by U.S. officers in the field revealing atrocities by U.S. forces to prevent them reaching Congress.

== See also ==
- Brigadier General John Donaldson
- Human Rights Record of the United States
- Pentagon Papers
- Phoenix Program
- Tiger Force
- War crimes committed by the United States
