= David Barsamian =

Armenian-American radio broadcaster (born 1945)

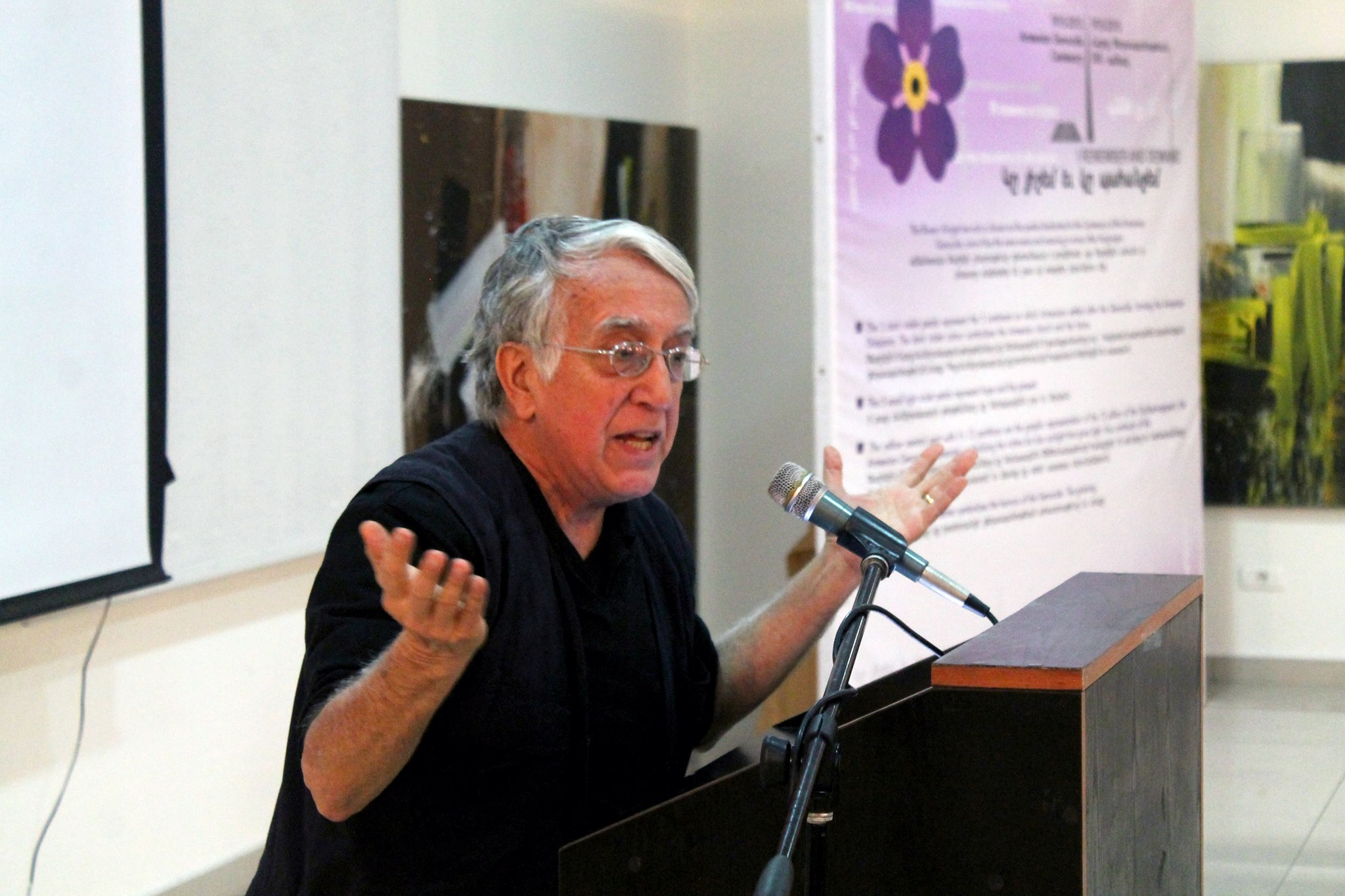
- Barsamian giving a lecture, "The Twilight of Capitalism", at a ZOMTalks event in Lebanon hosted by ARF's Zavarian Student Association on February 23, 2016.
- Born: 1945 (age 80–81)
- Occupations: Founder and Director of Alternative Radio
- Website: alternativeradio.org/pages/about-barsamian

David Barsamian (born 1945) is an Armenian-American radio broadcaster, writer, and the founder and director of Alternative Radio, a Boulder, Colorado–based syndicated weekly public affairs program heard on some 250 radio stations worldwide.

Barsamian started working in radio in 1978 at KGNU in Boulder, Colorado, and then KRZA in Alamosa, Colorado.

Articles by (and interviews with) Barsamian have appeared regularly in The Progressive, The Sun and Z Magazine. Barsamian also lectures on U.S. foreign policy, corporate control, the media, and propaganda.

As a writer, Barsamian is best known for his series of interviews with Noam Chomsky, which have been published in book form and translated into many languages.

== Deportation from India ==
On 23 September 2011, Barsamian was deported from India. After arriving on a flight at the Indira Gandhi International Airport, he was refused entry and placed on a return flight. Barsamian attributes this to his reportage on human rights abuses in Jammu and Kashmir.

== Bibliography ==
Year	Title	Publisher	ISBN	Notes
1992	Chronicles of Dissent	Consortium Book Sales & Distribution	ISBN 0-96288-388-3	Interviews with Noam Chomsky
1992	Stenographers to Power: Media and Propaganda	Common Courage Press	ISBN 0-96288-385-9	Interviews with Noam Chomsky
1994	Keeping the Rabble in Line	Common Courage Press	ISBN 1-56751-033-7	Interviews with Noam Chomsky
1994	The Pen and the Sword	Haymarket Books (2010 reprint)	ISBN 1-93185-995-7	Interviews with Edward Said
1994	Secrets, Lies and Democracy	Odonian Press	ISBN 1-87882-504-6	Interviews with Noam Chomsky; part of The Chomsky Trilogy (ISBN 1-87882-507-0); part of The Chomsky Quartet (ISBN 1-87882-516-X)
1994	The Prosperous Few and the Restless Many	Odonian Press	ISBN 1-87882-503-8	Interviews with Noam Chomsky; part of The Chomsky Trilogy (ISBN 1-87882-507-0); part of The Chomsky Quartet (ISBN 1-87882-516-X)
1994	What Uncle Sam Really Wants	Odonian Press	ISBN 1-87882-501-1	Interviews with Noam Chomsky; part of The Chomsky Trilogy (ISBN 1-87882-507-0); part of The Chomsky Quartet (ISBN 1-87882-516-X)
1996	Class Warfare	Pluto Press	ISBN 1-56751-092-2	Interviews with Noam Chomsky
1998	The Common Good	Odonian Press	ISBN 1-87882-508-9	Interviews with Noam Chomsky; part of The Chomsky Quartet
1999	The Future of History	Common Courage Press	ISBN 1-56751-157-0	Interviews with Howard Zinn
2017	Confronting Empire	South End Press	ISBN 0-89608-615-1	Interviews with Eqbal Ahmad
2001	The Decline and Fall of Public Broadcasting	South End Press	ISBN 0-89608-654-2	
2001	Propaganda and the Public Mind	Pluto Press	ISBN 0-74531-788-X	Interviews with Noam Chomsky
2001	9-11	Seven Stories Press	ISBN 1-58322-489-0	Interviews with Noam Chomsky
2001	Terrorism: Theirs and Ours	Seven Stories Press	ISBN 1-58322-490-4	Interviews with Eqbal Ahmad
2003	The Checkbook and the Cruise Missile	South End Press	ISBN 0-89608-710-7	Interviews with Arundhati Roy
2003	Culture and Resistance	Pluto Press	ISBN 0-74532-017-1	Interviews with Edward Said
2004	Louder Than Bombs: Interviews from The Progressive Magazine	South End Press	ISBN 0-89608-725-5	
2005	Imperial Ambitions: Conversations With Noam Chomsky On The Post-9/11 World	Macmillan	ISBN 1-42998-081-8	
2005	Speaking of the Empire and Resistance: Interviews with Tariq Ali	The New Press	ISBN 1-56584-954-X	
2006	Original Zinn: Conversations on History and Politics with David Barsamian	HarperCollins (2009 reprint)	ISBN 0-06175-141-3	Interviews with Howard Zinn
2007	Targeting Iran	City Lights Books	ISBN 0-87286-458-8	Interviews with Noam Chomsky, Ervand Abrahamian and Nahid Mozaffari
2007	What We Say Goes: Conversations on U.S. Power in a Changing World	Metropolitan Books	ISBN 0-80508-671-4	Interviews with Noam Chomsky
2011	How the World Works	Soft Skull Press	ISBN 978-1-59376-427-2	Interviews with Noam Chomsky
2012	Occupy the Economy: Challenging Capitalism	City Lights Books	ISBN 0-87286-568-1	Interviews with Richard Wolff
2013	Power Systems: Conversations on Global Democratic Uprisings and the New Challenges to U.S. Empire	Macmillan	ISBN 0-80509-616-7	Interviews with Noam Chomsky
2017	Global Discontents: Conversations on the Rising Threats to Democracy	Macmillan	ISBN 9781250146182	Interviews with Noam Chomsky
2020	ReTargeting Iran	City Lights Publishers	ISBN 9780872868045	With Ervand Abrahamian, Noam Chomsky, Nader Hashemi, Azadeh Moaveni, and Trita Parsi
2022	Notes on Resistance	Haymarket Books	ISBN 9781642596984	Interviews with Noam Chomsky

== Filmography ==
Year	Film	Notes
1992	Manufacturing Consent: Noam Chomsky and the Media	Credited in the acknowledgments as a source for archival audio, appeared onscreen as an interviewer
2006	Independent Intervention	
2013	Targeting Iran	Interviewee in documentary based on his book of the same name

== See also ==
- List of Armenian Americans
