= Human Rights Record of the United States =

Annual publication on human rights in the US

The Human Rights Record of the United States is an annual publication by the Information Office of the State Council of the People's Republic of China as a retort to the Country Reports on Human Rights Practices by the United States Department of State. The report was first issued in 1998, which each of the Chinese reports citing the U.S. State Department's report in the first paragraph.

== Overview ==
The Human Rights Record of the United States is published annually as a retort to U.S. criticism of China's human rights policies in the annual Country Reports on Human Rights Practices, published by the State Department of the United States. The inaugural Chinese report stated that the State Department reports are "full of distortions and accusations of the human rights situation in more than 190 countries and regions including China. However, the United States turned a blind eye to its own terrible human rights situation and seldom mentioned it." It said that the United States uses the human rights issues as "a political instrument to defame other nations' image and seek its own strategic interests." The report asserted "[The U.S. State Department] released the 'Country Reports on Human Rights Practices' year after year to accuse and blame other countries for their human rights practices. These moves fully expose the United States hypocrisy by exercising double standards on human rights and its malicious design to pursue hegemony under the pretext of human rights." Subsequent reports have continued to levy similar criticisms against the U.S. report.

The Chinese reports typically criticize U.S. domestic social and economic issues, such as poverty, crime and racism. Some of the data cited in the reports is derived from official or authoritative sources; other sections are composed from a variety of material found online, some of which may be anecdotal.

Regarding the 2010 report, Fareed Zakaria wrote: "The report loses itself and takes away from the more serious charges it does make about Guantánamo Bay and CIA detention facilities. The Chinese government should get the report done by serious Chinese scholars, of whom there are many, rather than the propaganda department of its Communist Party, which seems to have written this one."

A 2025 comparative study by Keyu Alexander Chen Glanz of Georgia State University compared the U.S. State Department's human rights reports on China to China's Human Rights Record of the United States, identifying them as competing narratives within international relations. Glanz found the reports to function as part of a broader diplomatic rivalry in which both governments seek to frame human rights narratives in ways that legitimize their own political systems while delegitimizing the other, with the United States typically presenting itself as a defender of civil liberties and democratic freedoms, and China typically portraying human rights primarily in terms of socioeconomic welfare and social stability, emphasizing issues like poverty, gun violence, racial inequality, and access to health and education. The Chinese reports tend to attribute responsibility for human rights abuses to a wider range of actors within the United States, including law enforcement agencies, political institutions, and individuals involved in violent incidents, with problems portrayed as systemic issues of American society rather than solely the actions of government authorities.

== See also ==
- Human rights in China
- Human rights in the United States
- China–United States relations
