= Nick Turse =

American investigative journalist, historian, and author

- Born: 1975 (age 50–51)
- Education: Rutgers University-Newark, MA; Columbia University, PhD
- Occupations: Journalist, author

Nick Turse (born 1975) is an American investigative journalist, historian, and author. He is the associate editor and research director of the blog TomDispatch and a fellow at The Nation Institute.

== Education ==
Turse earned an MA in history from Rutgers University–Newark in 1999 and his doctorate in sociomedical sciences from the Columbia University's Graduate School of Arts and Sciences (GSAS) in 2005. As a graduate student, Turse was a fellow at Harvard University's Radcliffe Institute for Advanced Study in 2010-2011 and at New York University's Center for the United States and the Cold War. He also worked as an associate research scientist at the Mailman School's of Public Health Center for the History and Ethics at Columbia University.

In 2001, while researching in the U.S. National Archives, Turse discovered records of a Pentagon task force called the Vietnam War Crimes Working Group that was formed as a result of the My Lai massacre. These records became the focus of his doctoral dissertation, Kill Anything That Moves: United States War Crimes and Atrocities in Vietnam, 1965–1973.

== Career ==
Turse is a contributing writer at the blog TomDispatch. He has written for publications such as The Guardian, The New York Times, the Los Angeles Times, Harper's Magazine, Vice News and the BBC on subjects such as ethnic cleansing in South Sudan, the U.S. military in Africa, the video game industry, street art, the war in Afghanistan, and the Vietnam War. He has also reviewed books for the San Francisco Chronicle, The Daily Beast, Asia Times, and other publications.

=== South Sudanese Civil War ===
Turse has reported on the South Sudanese civil war that began in 2013 including an investigation of a government ethnic cleansing campaign for Harper's, and wrote a book on the South Sudanese civil war, Next Time They'll Come to Count The Dead. Kenneth Roth, the executive director of Human Rights Watch wrote, "Turse gives a sobering account of the horrific crimes against ordinary people that define South Sudan's conflict. He shows how efforts to count the dead, investigate the crimes, and bring perpetrators to justice have so far failed. His compelling account reminds us why accountability is both urgent and necessary." The Los Angeles Review of Books said Turse "delivers a scathing and deeply reported account of South Sudan's suffering since its collapse in December 2013." Next Time They'll Come to Count The Dead was a finalist for the 2016 Investigative Reporters and Editors, Inc. book award.

=== Drone papers ===
Turse was part of the investigative team at The Intercept that won the 2016 New York Press Club Award for Special Event Reporting and the 2016 Online Journalism Association Award for Investigative Data Journalism for "The Drone Papers". The Intercept had obtained a cache of secret documents detailing the inner workings of the U.S. military's assassination program in Afghanistan, Yemen, and Somalia. The documents, provided by a whistleblower, offered an unprecedented glimpse into President Obama's drone wars.

=== Los Angeles Times series ===
Turse is the co-author of a series of articles for the Los Angeles Times that was a finalist for the 2006 Tom Renner Award for Outstanding Crime Reporting from Investigative Reporters and Editors, Inc. This investigation, based on declassified Army records, interviews, and a trip to Vietnam, found that U.S. troops reported more than 800 war crimes in Vietnam. Turse asserted that many were publicly discredited even as the military uncovered evidence that they were telling the truth.

=== Operation Speedy Express exposé ===
In a 2008 exposé in The Nation for which he won the Ridenhour Prize, Turse reported on a veteran whistleblower who served in Operation Speedy Express.

=== Kill Anything That Moves... ===
Turse has described Kill Anything That Moves... (2013) as a history of Vietnamese civilian suffering at the hands of U.S. troops during the Vietnam War. The book is based on archival materials Turse discovered and interviews he conducted with eyewitnesses in the U.S. and Vietnam, including a hundred American Vietnam War veterans. Turse won a 2014 American Book Award and an Izzy (I.F. Stone) Award for Kill Anything That Moves....

Writing in The Huffington Post, Peter Van Buren called the book "one of the most important books about the American War in Vietnam." John Tirman of The Washington Post wrote, "Turse forcefully argues the narrower question of how the government failed to prosecute crimes committed in Vietnam or Cambodia."

Writing in Proceedings Magazine, the official publication of the U.S. Naval Institute, Richard Ruth, a professor of SE Asian Studies at the U.S. Naval Academy wrote: "Turse argues that the enormous toll of civilian victims was neither accidental nor unpredictable. The Pentagon's demand for quantifiable corpses surged down the chain of command, through all branches of the U.S. military, until many units had become fixated on producing indiscriminate casualties that they could claim as enemy kills. Under this system, killing was incentivized: those with high body counts not only got promoted more quickly, their units were treated better and enjoyed greater safety than those who missed their 'killing quotas'... The incentivizing of death encouraged some U.S. soldiers to rack up thousands of kills over multiple tours. In a telling detail repeated in many of the case studies examined, the alleged Viet Cong eliminated by these American super killers often had no weapons on them when they were gunned down. Turse makes it clear that such high numbers would have been all but impossible without the inclusion of innocent bystanders." Ruth also wrote: "Turse combines original on-site investigations and fresh archival research with a rich sampling of supporting material from several well-known histories and memoirs. A journalist by training, he interviewed survivors from several massacres as a supplement to the Criminal Investigation Command files he uncovered. The disparity in details between the survivors' horrific recollections and the doubting tone of the official military files is jarring. In many of the cases the reported war crimes, most of them based on evidence from concerned GIs, are dismissed for lack of interest as much as for lack of evidence," and "Turse's study is not anti-veteran, anti-military, or anti-American."

Three of the biggest alleged mass murderers of civilians, according to Turse, are Sergeant Roy E. Bumgarner, nicknamed "The Bummer," Colonel John W. Donaldson, who was latter promoted to General and nicknamed the "Gook-hunting" General, or Colonel and General Julian Ewell, nicknamed "The Butcher of the Delta." Turse and others claim that the reason killing so many civilians wasn't widely prosecuted was partly because of what was known as the Mere Gook Rule when soldiers were taught not to think of the Vietnamese lives as important. It was common for soldiers and higher officials to come to the defense of those accused of killing civilians, especially graduates of West Point in what was known as the West Point Protection Association. One of the subordinates of Colonel John W. Donaldson who came to his defense was then Major Colin Powell who initially vouched for him, but later admitted that Colonel Donaldson may have routinely “killed or ordered the killing of, unarmed and unresisting” Vietnamese civilians from his helicopter. Colonel Donaldson also praised Powell as “the finest Major I have known and clearly one of the most outstanding all-round officers I have served with.. . . . [P]ossessing great poise, he is a gifted speaker and talented writer. . . . [O]ne of those rare officers who should be marked for positions of the highest responsibility and promoted to General Officer rank ahead of his contemporaries.”

In Military Review, journalist and Vietnam war correspondent Arnold R. Isaacs states, "it would be a mistake to dismiss the facts set out in this book just because one dislikes the author's political slant. His conclusions may be overstated, but Turse makes a strong case that the dark side of America's war in Vietnam was a good deal darker than is commonly remembered. If the American war was not a crime against humanity, Turse confronts us with convincing evidence that there was an American war that it is hard to call anything else—and that we should not scrub this out of our history."

In another review of Turse's book, Peter Zinoman and Gary Kulik have accused Turse of omitting crucial context, selectively quoting "inflammatory witness comments" without corroboration, and pursuing an "ideologically driven caricature of the war in Vietnam." They also criticized Turse's approach as outdated and isolated from the current revisionist trends in the historical study of military violence against civilians. They stated that Turse's book continues following the orthodox approach—the "Americanist view of the war in Vietnam in history and memory". Turse's work was pointed out as "partial, misleading, and flawed methodologically." Gary Kulik contends that the works of Nick Turse and one of his mentors, Christian Appy, are overly supportive of the official Vietnamese communist narrative of the war that attempts to erase any histories/memories of South Vietnam before and after the North Vietnamese communist government violated the 1972 Paris Peace Accord, attacked, and took over Saigon and South Vietnam.

=== U.S. military operations in Africa ===
Noting that the U.S. Africa Command (Africom) contends that it maintains only a token presence on the African continent, Turse found recent U.S. military involvement with 49 African nations. He investigated the size and scope of U.S. military operations in Africa and concluded, "From north to south, east to west, the Horn of Africa to the Sahel, the heart of the continent to the islands off its coasts, the U.S. military is at work. Base construction, security cooperation engagements, training exercises, advisory deployments, special operations missions, and a growing logistics network, all undeniable evidence of expansion—except at U.S. Africa Command." In an investigation for The Intercept, Turse revealed U.S. Africa Command's previously unreported claims the African continent is home to almost 50 terrorist organizations and "illicit groups" that threaten U.S. interests.

Kelley B. Vlahos, the managing editor at The American Conservative, called Turse "by far the most dogged reporter of the U.S. military operations in Africa."

=== Special Operations Forces ===
Turse has carried out extensive investigations of the U.S. military's most elite troops. Turse uncovered that in 2014, elite U.S. troops were dispatched to 70 percent of the countries on the planet and were carrying out missions in 80 to 90 nations each day. In a 2015 article for The Nation, Turse revealed that under the Obama administration, U.S. special operations forces deployed to 147 countries that year. Turse followed up to show that elite forces like Navy SEALs and Army Special forces deployed to 138 nations in 2016. In 2017, Turse wrote an article that revealed U.S. special forces had already deployed to 137 countries by mid-year.

=== U.S. military training programs ===
In a major investigation carried out by 100Reporters and The Intercept, Turse revealed "...the largely unknown details of a vast constellation of global training exercises, operations, facilities, and schools—a shadowy network of U.S. programs that every year provides instruction and assistance to approximately 200,000 foreign soldiers, police, and other personnel." Data leaked by a whistleblower showed that training was carried out at no fewer than 471 locations in 120 countries—on every continent but Antarctica—involving, on the U.S. side, 150 defense agencies, civilian agencies, armed forces colleges, defense training centers, military units, private companies, and NGOs, as well as the National Guard forces of five states.

In a separate investigation, Turse analyzed the expansion of the U.S. military's Joint Combined Exchange Training (JCET) program, which is designed to train America's special operators in a variety of missions from "foreign internal defense" to "unconventional warfare". Analyzing government files, Turse found that U.S. troops carried out approximately one mission every two days in 2014. Navy SEALs, Army Green Berets, and others on 176 individual JCETs, a 13 percent increase from 2013. The number of countries involved jumped even further, from 63 to 87.

In an earlier investigation for The Intercept, Turse revealed "that from 2012 to 2014 some of America's most elite troops—including Navy SEALs and Army Green Berets—carried out 500 Joint Combined Exchange Training missions around the world", a number that the U.S. military had previously refused to reveal.

=== Afghan War victims ===
With journalists Robert Dreyfuss and Sarah Holewinski, Turse investigated civilian casualties in Afghanistan in a special issue of The Nation. They found that no agency or entity had tracked civilian casualties over the entire conflict. In 2008, the International Security Assistance Force (ISAF) and the U.S. military set up a Civilian Casualty Tracking Cell whose goal was to track and lower civilian casualties. According to Dreyfuss and Turse, most civilians who died in the conflict did so at the hands of the Taliban and its allies, but that many thousands of Afghan civilians had been killed by U.S. and allied forces.

=== Columbine as revolutionary act ===
In the winter 2000 issue of the journal 49th Parallel, Turse wrote of Eric Harris and Dylan Klebold, the perpetrators of the Columbine High School massacre, "Who would not concede that terrorizing the American machine, at the very site where it exerts its most powerful influence, is a truly revolutionary task? To be inarticulate about your goals, even to not understand them, does not negate their existence. Approve or disapprove of their methods, vilify them as miscreants, but don't dare disregard these modern radicals as anything less than the latest incarnation of disaffected insurgents waging the ongoing American revolution." Historian David Farber of Temple University wrote that Turse's assertion "only makes sense in an academic culture in which transgression is by definition political and in which any rage against society can be considered radical."

== Recognition ==
- 2006 Tom Renner Award for Outstanding Crime Reporting from Investigative Reporters and Editors, Inc., Finalist
- 2009 James Aronson Award for Social Justice Journalism
- 2009 MOLLY National Journalism Prize honorable mention
- 2009 Ridenhour Prize, for investigation into the killing of Vietnamese civilians by American troops during Operation Speedy Express
- 2016 New York Press Club Award for Special Event Reporting
- 2016 Online Journalism Association Award for Investigative Data Journalism
- 2016 American Book Award, for Tomorrow's Battlefield: U.S. Proxy Wars and Secret Ops in Africa.
- 2016 Investigative Reporters and Editors, Inc. book award, Finalist.

== Works ==
- Turse, Nick. The Complex: How the Military Invades Our Everyday Lives. New York: Metropolitan Books, 2008.
- Turse, Nick. The Case for Withdrawal from Afghanistan. London: Verso, 2010.
- Turse, Nick, and Tom Engelhardt. Terminator Planet: The First History of Drone Warfare, 2001-2050. Lexington, KY: Dispatch Books, 2012.
- Turse, Nick. The Changing Face of Empire: Special Ops, Drones, Spies, Proxy Fighters, Secret Bases, and Cyberwarfare. Chicago: Haymarket Books, 2012.
- Turse, Nick. Kill Anything That Moves: The Real American War in Vietnam. New York: Metropolitan Books/Henry Holt and Co., 2013.
- Turse, Nick. Tomorrow's Battlefield: U.S. Proxy Wars and Secret Ops in Africa. Chicago, IL: Haymarket Books/Dispatch Books, 2015.
- Turse, Nick. Next Time They'll Come to Count The Dead: War and Survival in South Sudan. Chicago, IL: Haymarket Books/Dispatch Books, 2016.

== See also ==
- American war crimes
- List of massacres in Vietnam
- Operation Wheeler/Wallowa
- Pentagon Papers
- Phoenix Program
- United States perpetrated crimes
- Vietnam War casualties
