= Tom Engelhardt =

American writer and editor (born 1944)

Thomas M. Engelhardt (born 1944) is an American writer and editor. He is the creator of Type Media Center's tomdispatch.com, an online blog. He is also the co-founder of the American Empire Project and the author of the 1998 book, The End of Victory Culture: Cold War America and the Disillusioning of a Generation.

In 1991, he was awarded a Guggenheim Fellowship.

== Career ==
Engelhardt graduated from Yale University and then completed a master's degree in East Asian Studies from Harvard University. As an undergraduate he was attracted to the study of Chinese history by Mary C. Wright, and was a research assistant for Jonathan Spence.

At Harvard he was a founding member of the Committee of Concerned Asian Scholars and became involved in a draft resistance movement in opposition to the American war in Vietnam. As a result of these activities, he became a printer and moved to Berkeley, California. There he began to write about the resistance to the war, and, as he later put it, "the next thing I knew I was a journalist and an editor."

Engelhardt has worked in book and news publishing. He has edited hundreds of writers, including Mike Davis, Adam Hochschild, Studs Terkel, and Noam Chomsky. He was a senior editor at Pantheon Books where he edited such books as Maus by Art Spiegelman, and has been a consulting editor at Metropolitan Books. He also taught at the Graduate School of Journalism at the University of California, Berkeley as a teaching fellow. He once described the editing process as "more like a craft, that's right, because there isn't as much of a preset pattern for it. There's a word I often think about because it's such a negative in our society, which is 'used.' You say a 'used' car—something previously owned and not particularly good, or 'I've been used, I've been exploited.' But the most beautiful feeling about editing for an editor is that feeling of being used and subsumed."

Engelhardt created TomDispatch in November 2001; in 2002, The Nation Institute published it on the Institute's website, calling it "a regular antidote to the mainstream media". He has described the site as the "sideline that ate his life". Contributors have included Rebecca Solnit, Bill McKibben, Jonathan Schell, Fatima Bhutto, Nick Turse, Pepe Escobar, Noam Chomsky, and Andrew Bacevich. He has written several books including The American Way of War: How Bush's Wars Became Obama's, and writes for Salon and The Nation.

== Works ==
- The End of Victory Culture: Cold War America and the Disillusioning of a Generation (Basic Books, 1995)
- The World According to Tomdispatch: America In The New Age of Empire (Verso, 2008)
- The American Way of War: How Bush's Wars Became Obama's (Haymarket, 2010)
- The United States of Fear (Haymarket, 2011)
- Shadow Government: Surveillance, Secret Wars, and a Global Security State in a Single Superpower World. (Haymarket, 2014)
- A Nation Unmade by War. (Haymarket Books, 2018)
