= Oxnard College =

Community college in Oxnard, California, US

Coordinates: 34°09′50.98″N 119°09′26.39″W

- Type: Public community college
- Established: 1975
- Parent institution: Ventura County Community College District
- Endowment: $151,380 (2011/2012)
- Students: 7,694
- Location: Oxnard, California, U.S.
- Campus: 118 acres (48 ha)
- Nickname: Condors
- Sporting affiliations: CCCAA – WSC
- Website: oxnardcollege.edu

Oxnard College is a public community college in Oxnard, California, United States. Established in 1975 by the Ventura County Community College District, it serves the Oxnard Plain cities of Oxnard, Camarillo, and Port Hueneme. Oxnard College offers both degrees and certificates in 26 different fields. The college offers associate degrees — including the California transfer curriculum — and one bachelor's degree, as well as career and technical education programs to the local community.

== History ==
The first two permanent buildings were occupied in the fall of 1979. In 2002, due to the passage of the Measure S bond, Oxnard College received $129 million that would be allocated towards new buildings and renovations. These newly acquired funds led to the creation of new building on campus such as Condor Cafe in 2009. The campus also held dedication ceremonies for the new buildings, including a new Student Services building in 2009, a new Performing Arts building in Spring 2011, a new Library Learning Resource Center (LLRC) in June 2012, and a new Dental Hygiene building in 2016. Some renovations that were also made to existing buildings were an expansion of classrooms in the Child Development Center. This also included the renovation and expansion of athletic facilities which included a new track/soccer stadium, a new softball field, and upgraded baseball facilities. In 2014, renovation and seismic retrofitting began on the old Learning Resource Center (LRC) building; the work was completed in 2017 and the building is now known as Condor Hall.

== Academics ==
There are three academic departments at Oxnard College:

- Career & Technical Education;
- Library & Liberal Studies;
- Math, Science, Health, PE and Athletics.

A four-year dental hygiene bachelor's degree program was announced in 2024, and began effectively in the fall of 2025.

== Student services ==
The Dream Resource Center provides resources to undocumented students.

The Extended Opportunities Program (EOPS) is designed to specifically aid low income students. The EOPS helps students navigate college and focuses on being a tool for those students who need an extra hand.

The Oxnard College Honors Program, which began in the fall of 2019, comprises specialized courses aimed at developing academic aptitude.

== Athletics ==
Oxnard's athletic teams are nicknamed the Condors. The college currently sponsors four men's and four women's varsity teams. The college competes as a member of the California Community College Athletic Association (CCCAA) in the Western State Conference (WSC).

== Notable alumni ==
Notable alumni of Oxnard College include:

- René Corado — ornithologist and writer
- Judith Kelley — Dean of Duke University's Sanford School of Public Policy
- Jeremiah Massey - Professional Basketball player
- Carmen Perez — civil rights activist
- Jack Wilson - Former Major League Baseball player
