= Toxic food environment =

Food consumption trend in the United States

A food environment is the "physical presence of food that affects a person's diet, a person's proximity to food store locations, the distribution of food stores, food service, and any physical entity by which food may be obtained, or a connected system that allows access to food".

The term toxic food environment was coined by Kelly D. Brownell in his book, Food Fight: The Inside Story of the Food Industry which describes American culture at the end of the 20th century as one that fosters and promotes obesity and unprecedented food consumption. In the United States, the food environment the citizens are encompassed in makes it far too hard to choose healthy foods, and all too easy to choose unhealthy foods. Some call this food environment "'toxic' because of the way it corrodes healthy lifestyles and promotes obesity".

Brownell was a Yale professor and director of the Rudd Center for Food Policy and Obesity at Yale. He is now director of the World Food Policy Center of the Sanford School of Public Policy at Duke University. He uses the term "toxic" to describe unparalleled exposure to high-calorie, high-fat, heavily marketed, inexpensive, and readily accessible foods. The toxic environment is the result of ubiquity of unhealthy, processed foods, an increasingly sedentary lifestyle in which individuals spend more time watching TV and using computers than they spend exercising, the explosion of fast food restaurants, the enormous growth of portion sizes, the power of food advertising and marketing, and the junk food industry's takeover of schools by selling unhealthy items in vending machines, cafeterias, and through school fundraisers.

A main contributor to the notion of a toxic food environment is the marketing of it. Finding an advertisement that promotes "toxic" is not a difficult task. The Federal Trade Commission found, in 2008, that the food industry spent almost $10 billion per year on marketing food and beverages, including $1.6 billion toward children.

Marketing for "toxic" food has infused the consumption of unhealthy, processed food into US culture. Brownell and many of his colleagues attribute the nation's obesity epidemic to the toxic environment. In 1995, the Institute of Medicine noted that the human gene pool has not undergone any real change over the past several decades when obesity has been on the rise. Therefore, the root of the obesity crisis must lie in the environment—the social and cultural forces that promote an over-abundance of food and eating, and a deficit of physical activity.

== See also ==
- Food Fight: The Inside Story of the Food Industry (book)
