= Bruce R. Kuniholm =

1st Dean of the Sanford School of Public Policy
- In office July 1, 2009 – July 1, 2013
- Preceded by: Office established
- Succeeded by: Kelly D. Brownell

Bruce R. Kuniholm is an American academic and the former dean of Duke University’s Sanford School of Public Policy. A Professor of Public Policy and History, his field of research expertise is concentrated primarily on U.S. Foreign Policy in the Near and Middle East.

== Inauguration ==
Kuniholm was inaugurated as the dean of the Sanford School of Public Policy in 2009, when the university’s Institute of Public Policy officially became a School. Kuniholm previously held the position of Director of the Terry Sanford Institute of Public Policy at Duke University from 1989 to 1994 and from 2005 to 2009; he also served as Vice Provost for Academic and International Affairs at Duke University from 1996 to 2001, along with serving as Director of the Center for International Studies at Duke.

== Before Duke ==
Before coming to Duke University, Kuniholm worked in the Bureau of Intelligence and Research and as a member of the Policy Planning staff at the U.S. Dept. of State. He is a veteran of the United States Armed Forces, having served as a Marine Rifle Platoon Commander in Vietnam.

== Other work ==
Kuniholm has lectured in 24 countries and been granted fellowships from the National Endowment for the Humanities, the Council on Foreign Relations, the Woodrow Wilson International Center for Scholars, the Norwegian Nobel Institute, and the Fulbright Foundation. He is author of the book The Origins of the Cold War in the Near East: Great Power Conflict and Diplomacy in Iran, Turkey, and Greece (Princeton University Press, 1980), which won the Stuart L. Bernath Prize of the Society for Historians of American Foreign Relations. He has also written a number of scholarly articles focusing on International Relations.

== Degrees ==
Kuniholm’s academic degrees are as follows:

- History, PhD, Duke University, 1976
- Policy Sciences, M.A.P.P.S, Duke University, 1976
- History, M.A., Duke University, 1972
- English, A.B., Dartmouth College, 1964
- French, University of Dijon, France, 1962
