= Aviva Chomsky =

American historian (born 1957)

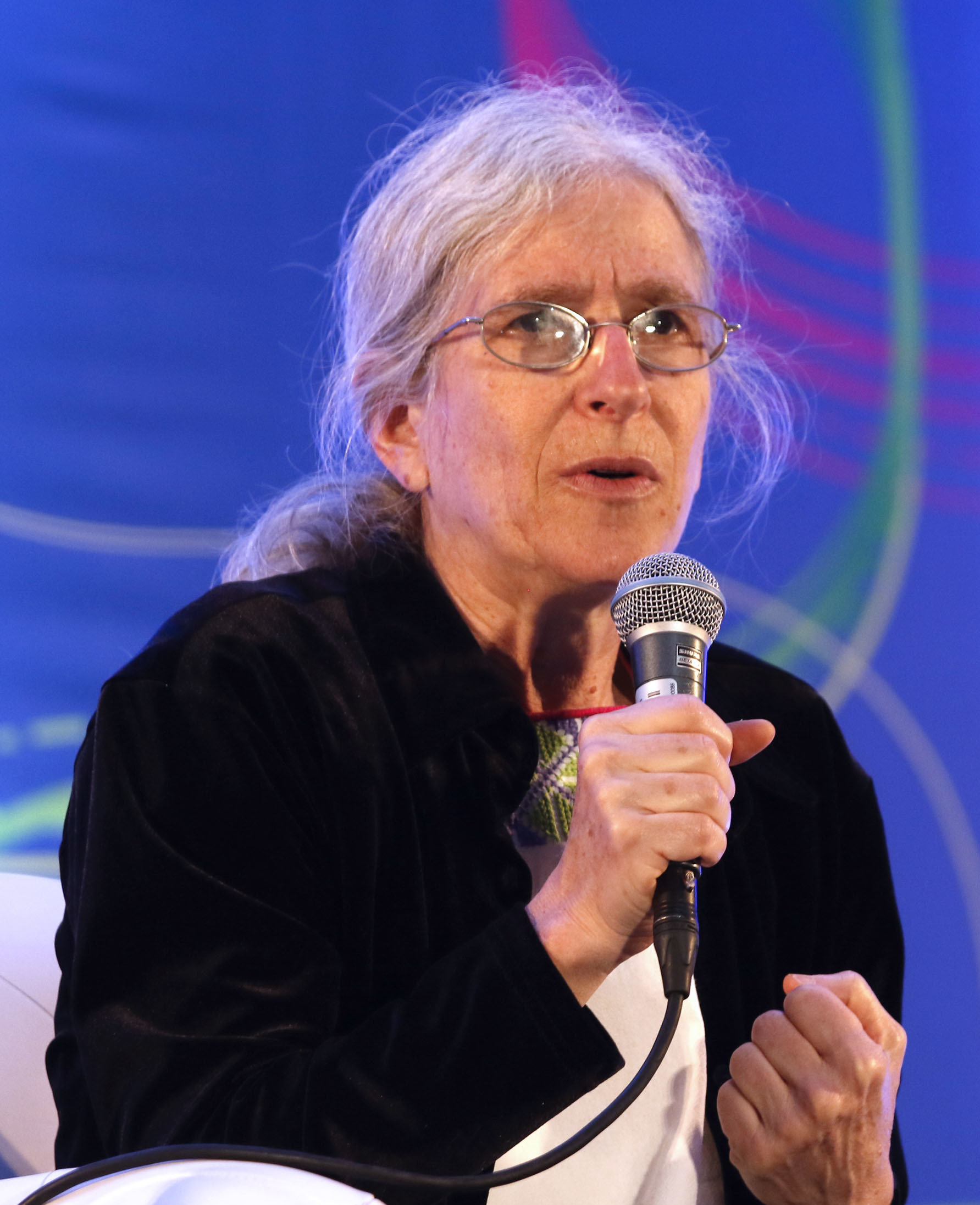
- Chomsky in 2016
- Born: April 20, 1957 (age 69); Boston, Massachusetts, U.S.
- Education: University of California, Berkeley (BA, MA, PhD)
- Occupations: Historian; author; activist
- Parents: Noam Chomsky (father); Carol Schatz (mother)
- Relatives: William Chomsky (grandfather)

Aviva Chomsky (born April 20, 1957) is an American historian, author and activist. She is a professor of history and the Coordinator of Latin American, Latino and Caribbean Studies at Salem State University in Massachusetts. She previously taught at Bates College in Maine.

== Early life ==
She is the eldest daughter of linguists Noam and Carol Chomsky. Her paternal grandfather, William Chomsky, was a Hebrew scholar at Gratz College, where he served as principal for many years.

== Career and education ==
Between 1976 and 1977, Chomsky worked for the United Farm Workers union. She credited this experience with sparking her "interest in the Spanish language, in migrant workers and immigration, in labor history, in social movements and labor organizing, in multinationals and their workers, in how global economic forces affect individuals, and how people collectively organize for social change". At the University of California at Berkeley, she earned a B.A. in Spanish and Portuguese in 1982, an M.A. in history in 1985, and a Ph.D. in history in 1990. She began teaching at Bates College, and became an associate professor of history at Salem State College in 1997, the Coordinator of Latin American Studies in 1999, and a full professor in 2002.

Chomsky's book West Indian Workers and the United Fruit Company in Costa Rica 1870–1940 was awarded the 1997 Best Book Prize by the New England Council of Latin American Studies. It describes the history of the United Fruit Company, formed in 1899 from the merger of multiple U.S.-based companies that built railroads and cultivated bananas on the Atlantic Coast of Costa Rica. It also shows how the workers, including many Jamaicans of African descent, developed their own parallel socioeconomic system.

Chomsky has been active in Latin American solidarity and immigrants’ rights issues since the 1980s. She is a member of the North Shore Colombia Solidarity Committee. Her articles on immigration rights have appeared in The Nation, HuffPost and TomDispatch, a project of The Nation Institute, and she has delivered lectures across the world on labor rights and immigration rights.

== Publications ==
=== Books ===
- Is Science Enough?: Forty Critical Questions About Climate Justice, Beacon Press, Boston Massachusetts. April 2022. ISBN 978-0807015766
- Central America's Forgotten History: Revolution, Violence, and the Roots of Migration, Beacon Press, Boston Massachusetts. April 2021. ISBN 978-080705648-6
- Undocumented: How Immigration Became Illegal, Beacon Press, Boston Massachusetts. 2014. ISBN 978-080700167-7
- A History of the Cuban Revolution, Wiley-Blackwell, New York, NY . Paperback. 224 pages. October 2010. ISBN 978-1-4051-8773-2
- Linked Labor Histories: New England, Colombia, and the Making of a Global Working Class. Duke University Press, Durham, North Carolina. 2008. ISBN 0-8223-4190-5
- The People Behind Colombian Coal/Bajo el manto del carbon, Aviva Chomsky, Garry Leech, Steve Striffler (Editors), 2007. ISBN 958-97995-5-8
- They Take Our Jobs! and 20 Other Myths About Immigration. Beacon Press, July 2007. Paperback: 236 pages . In English. (ISBN 978-0807041567).
- West Indian Workers and the United Fruit Company in Costa Rica, 1870–1940. Baton Rouge: Louisiana State University Press, 1996. ISBN 0-8071-1979-2
- Identity and Struggle at the Margins of the Nation-State: The Laboring People of Central America and the Hispanic Caribbean, (Comparative and International Working-Class History), Aviva Chomsky and Aldo Lauria-Santiago (Editors), 1998. 404 pages. Duke University Press, Durham, North Carolina. (ISBN 978-0822322023)
- The Cuba Reader: History, Culture, Politics, Aviva Chomsky, Barry Carr, Pamela Maria Smorkaloff (Editors), Duke University Press, Durham, North Carolina, January 2004. (ISBN 978-0822331971).

=== Chapters ===
- The Dispossessed: Chronicles of the Desterrados of Colombia, Alfredo Molano, Haymarket Books, (ISBN 1-931859-17-5), 2005. (Foreword)
- The Profits of Extermination: How U.S. Corporate Power is Destroying Colombia, Francisco Ramírez Cuellar, Common Courage Press, (ISBN 1-56751-322-0), 2005. (Translation and introduction by Aviva Chomsky)
- Hidden Lives and Human Rights in the United States: Understanding the Controversies and Tragedies of Undocumented Immigration, edited by Lois Ann Lorentzen, Praeger Press (ISBN 1440828474), 2014. (Economic Impact of Migrants)
- Beyond Slavery: The Multilayered Legacy of Africans in Latin America and the Caribbean, edited by Darien J. Davis, Rowman & Littlefield, (ISBN 0742541312), 2007. (The Logic of Displacement: Afro-Colombians and the War in Colombia)
- Salem: Place, Myth and Memory, edited by Dane Morrison and Nancy Lusignan Schultz, Northeastern University Press, (ISBN 1555536506), 2004. (Salem as a Global City: 1850–2004)
- Identity and Struggle at the Margins of the Nation-State: The Laboring Peoples of Central America and the Hispanic Caribbean, edited by Aviva Chomsky and Lauria-Santiago, Duke University Press, (ISBN 0822322188) 1998. (Introduction and Laborers and Small-Holders in Costa Rica's Mining Communities: 1900–1940)
