= Jennifer Siegel =

American historian

Jennifer Siegel (born 28 November 1968) is the Bruce R. Kuniholm Distinguished Professor of History and Policy at the Sanford School of Public Policy at Duke University. She is known for her work on the diplomatic and military history of Europe.

== Education and career ==
She graduated with a B.A. in 1990 from Yale University, and earned a Ph.D. in 1998, also from Yale. From 2001 until 2003 Siegel was a lecturer at the University of Pennsylvania. In 2003 Siegel joined the history department at Ohio State University, and in 2021 she moved to Duke University where she was named the Bruce R. Kuniholm Chair in History and Public Policy.

== Selected publications ==
- Jackson, Peter J.; Jackson, Peter; Siegel, Jennifer (2005-04-30). Intelligence and Statecraft: The Use and Limits of Intelligence in International Society. Westport, Conn: Praeger. ISBN 978-0-275-97295-0.
- Siegel, Jennifer L. (2014). For Peace and Money: French and British Finance in the Service of Tsars and Commissars. Oxford: Oxford Studies in International History. ISBN 978-0-19-938781-6.
- Siegel, Jennifer (2020-09-17). Endgame: Britain, Russia and the Final Struggle for Central Asia. Bloomsbury Academic. ISBN 978-1-350-17998-1.
