= Food, Inc. (book) =

2009 book edited by Karl Weber

- Author: Karl Weber (editor)
- Language: English
- Publication date: 2009
- Publication place: United States

Food, Inc.: How Industrial Food Is Making Us Sicker, Fatter, and Poorer — And What You Can Do About It is a 2009 companion book to the documentary film of the same name about the industrialization of food production and about the negative results to human health and to the natural environment. Edited by Karl Weber, the book is co-published by Participant Media and PublicAffairs Books.

== See also ==
- Chicken: The Dangerous Transformation of America's Favorite Food (book)
- Food Fight: The Inside Story of the Food Industry (book)
