= National Policy and Legal Analysis Network to Prevent Childhood Obesity =

American public health organization

- Abbreviation: NPLAN
- Formation: 2007
- Type: Organization
- Purpose: Public health advocacy
- Location: Oakland, CA
- Technical Assistance VP: Quang H. Dang
- Communications Director: Genie Gratto
- CEO of parent organization, ChangeLab Solutions: Marice Ashe
- Affiliations: Robert Wood Johnson Foundation

The National Policy and Legal Analysis Network to Prevent Childhood Obesity, or NPLAN for short, is a nonprofit organization funded by the Robert Wood Johnson Foundation, and which, according to its website, plays an important role in the Foundation's effort to reverse the obesity epidemic by 2015, a commitment that was announced in 2007. Their partners include, in addition to the RWJF, Active Living by Design and the Rudd Center for Food Policy and Obesity at Yale.

They are run by ChangeLab Solutions, originally known as Public Health Law and Policy, which focuses not only on obesity but also on tobacco regulation. The NPLAN advocates for a soda tax, specifically an excise tax, and have published model legislation which earmarks the funds raised to go to programs to prevent and treat obesity.

According to the American Public Health Association, they provide "legal technical assistance focused on childhood obesity prevention policy." The Network has also "developed model menu labeling ordinances, requiring chain restaurants to post calorie and other nutrition information on menus." NPLAN has advocated for the use of licensing and zoning laws to "shape the way land is used and how businesses operate," and has praised regulations requiring nutrition standards on foods sold in snack machines in schools. According to their website, they "work on four broad issue areas: healthy community food systems, healthy schools, healthy land use planning, and food marketing." The American Bar Association's director of public health and policy Marice Ashe wrote the following soon after the NPLAN's founding was announced: "NPLAN will serve as an incubator where lawyers, policymakers, advocates, and scientists collaborate to produce legal and policy tools and resources. As research and products are developed, NPLAN will also operate as a national one-stop source for access to practical, efficient, and effective legal technical assistance products."
