= Chicken: The Dangerous Transformation of America's Favorite Food =

Non-fiction book by Steve Striffler

- Author: Steve Striffler
- Language: English
- Publisher: Yale University Press
- Publication date: 2005
- ISBN: 9780300095296

Chicken: The Dangerous Transformation of America's Favorite Food is a non-fiction book by Steve Striffler. It was first published by Yale University Press in 2005.

== Summary ==
At the beginning of the book the author says, "I used to eat chicken without much thought about where it came from, or how and by whom it was raised and processed. Life was much easier then." The book examines the chicken industry of the United States. The book is divided into two parts. The first part talks about the production and consumption of chicken. The second part talks about the workers participation in the production. The chicken industry has grown since World War II. The chicken industry is competitive and has disturbing labor strategies.

== Reception ==
- It was reviewed by Southern Methodist University.
- An Abolitionist Online review says, "I recommend Steve Striffler's book Chicken as a worthwhile contribution to this ongoing discussion."
- An American Ethnologist review says, "As a supplementary reader, this book would be a valuable addition to sociology, anthropology, and food studies courses."

== See also ==
- Food Inc.: A Participant Guide: How Industrial Food Is Making Us Sicker, Fatter, and Poorer—And What You Can Do About It (book)
- Food Fight: The Inside Story of the Food Industry (book)
