= Marlene Schwartz =

American food scientist

Marlene B. Schwartz is the current director of the Rudd Center for Food Policy and Health at the University of Connecticut.

== Education ==
Schwartz grew up in Columbia, Maryland. She received her bachelor's degree from Haverford College in 1988. She then attended Yale University, where she received her master's degree in 1992, her M.Phil. in 1993, and her Ph.D. in 1996.

== Career ==
From 1996 to 2006, Schwartz was the co-director of the Yale Center for Eating and Weight Disorders. She then served as the associate director of the Rudd Center prior to July 2013, when she was announced as the next director of the center, replacing Kelly D. Brownell. In 2014, Schwartz received the Sarah Samuels Award from the American Public Health Association.

Dr. Schwartz's current research focuses on how nutrition and wellness policies implemented in schools, food banks, and local communities can improve food security, diet equity, and health outcomes.

== Personal life ==
Schwartz is married to Jeff Babbin, with whom she has three daughters—Anna, Molly, and Charlotte. As of 2017, Schwartz and her family live in Guilford, Connecticut.
