= Guatemalan Americans =

Americans of Guatemalan birth or descent

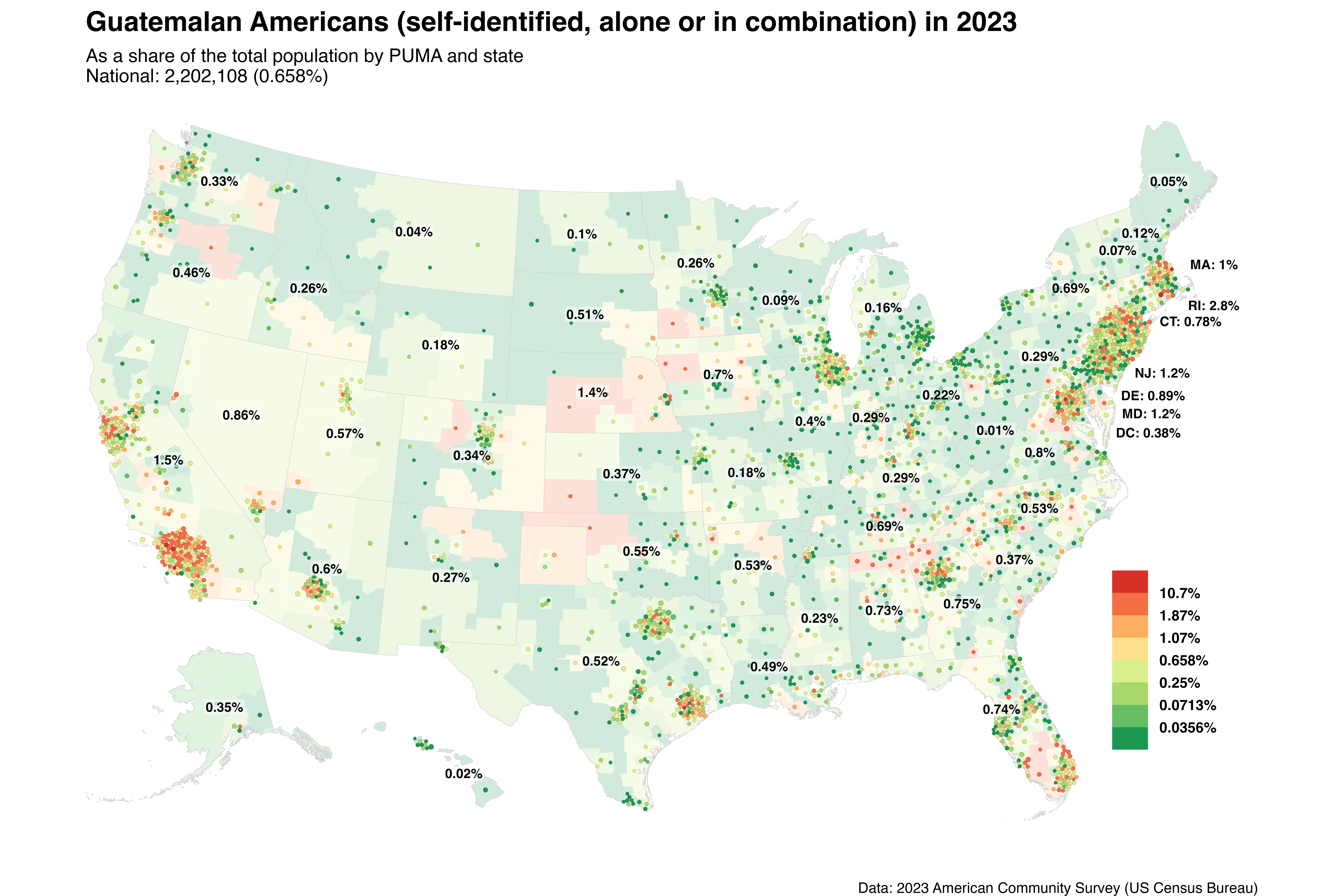

Total population
- 1,878,599 (2022); 0.56% of the U.S. population (2022)

Regions with significant populations
- New York City, Western New York, Boston, Philadelphia, North Jersey, Rhode Island, Chicago, Milwaukee, Delaware, Maryland, Washington, D.C., Virginia, Raleigh, Atlanta, Miami, Louisville, Minneapolis, Arkansas, Tulsa, Oklahoma City, Dallas, Houston, Seattle, Denver, Las Vegas Valley, Phoenix, Inland Empire, Southern California (especially in Los Angeles), San Francisco Bay Area

Languages
- American English, Guatemalan Spanish, Mayan languages, Spanglish

Religion
- Roman Catholic, Evangelical Christianity, Indigenous beliefs

Related ethnic groups
- Hispanic Americans, Guatemalans, Afro-Guatemalans, Indigenous Guatemalans, Spanish Americans, Mexican Americans, Honduran Americans, Salvadoran Americans, Indian Americans, Chinese Americans, Japanese Americans, Korean Americans, Native Americans

Guatemalan Americans (Spanish: guatemalteco-estadounidenses, norteamericanos de origen guatemalteco or estadounidenses de origen guatemalteco) are Americans of full or partial Guatemalan descent. The Guatemalan American population at the 2010 Census was 1,044,209. Guatemalans are the sixth largest Hispanic group in the United States and the second largest Central American population after Salvadorans. Half of the Guatemalan population is situated in two parts of the country, the Northeast and Southern California.

The states with the largest Guatemalan population are California (29%), Florida (8%) and Texas (7%).

== History of Guatemalans in the United States ==
Guatemalans have migrated to the U.S. since the 1930s and 1940s. Along with other Central Americans they first arrived by way of Mexico and settled in urban areas like Los Angeles, Chicago, New Orleans, Houston, New York City, Oakland, San Francisco, Maryland, Washington, D.C., and Northern Virginia.

The largest influx of Guatemalans into the United States, however, started occurring in the 1970s and 1980s, peaking in the 1990s due to the Guatemalan Civil War. Tens of thousands of Guatemalan refugees moved into the United States via Mexico; these refugees were both documented and undocumented. The Guatemalan Civil War ended in 1996. After September 11, 2001, new laws were enacted in Mexico limiting immigration visas and introduced other measures on the southern Mexican border through Plan Sur, a binational treaty with the Guatemalan government. There were 430,000 undocumented Guatemalans by 2008. 71% of Guatemalan immigrants are undocumented.

== Immigration ==
During the 1950s, there were 45,000 documented immigrants from Central America. In the 1960s, this number more than doubled to 100,000. In the decade after, it increased to 134,000. 26,000 of these immigrants were Guatemalan. Following the 1950s, Guatemala had been full of unrest with military dictatorships, civil wars, and a thirty-six year long guerrilla war. Those wars produced over 200,000 deaths, as well as the displacement of nearly one million refugees. In 1996, the Guatemalan government signed a peace accord. This ended the war; however, the war did not end for many Guatemalans who had to live alongside those who inflicted violence throughout their country.

During the Cold War, many Guatemalans immigrated to the United States due to the lack of stability from U.S. intervention. Consequently, many Guatemalans received Temporary Protected Status during that time period. These same Guatemalans lost that status once the war ended.

Migration from Central America had always been below 50,000. However, in 1970, the census had counted 113,913 Central American immigrants. 17,536 of those immigrants were of Guatemalan descent. This was a dramatic increase from the 5,381 count from the decade prior. The 1970s was when the United States experienced a high increase of Guatemalans. According to the 1970 census, there were 17,356 Guatemalans. This is a stark increase considering that there were only 5,381 Guatemalans when the 1960 census was taken. Immigration to the United States from Guatemala truly increased in 1977 with a total of 3,599. This was an 82% increase since the year prior. For the most part, this was due to the lack of stability within Guatemala's agricultural economy. For many Guatemalans, the agricultural economy was the job market for the disadvantaged. This market was not enough to sustain Guatemalans at the time - the unemployment rate was 25% and the poverty rate was at 84% In the 1970s, Guatemala experienced a culmination of factors that decreased their ability to uplift themselves from poverty. The infant mortality rate between 1970–1973 in Guatemala was around 82%. These circumstances included an increasing unemployment rate, as well as decreasing wages and opportunities in the rural sector. In 1976, they experienced an earthquake that left many homeless. These factors combined with the general violence caused many Guatemalans to look toward internal, intraregional, and international migration throughout the 1970s and 1980s. When fleeing conflict, many Guatemalans sought refuge in Mexico. For many, Mexico was just another transit point within their journeys. In 1982, Mexico experienced an economic crisis, which had made it difficult for many Guatemalans to sustain themselves. This helps explain the increase of Guatemalans entering the United States throughout the 1980s. Many indigenous Guatemalan workers in Mexico were recruited to work with companies within the United States. Many of these workers were already workers in Central American assembly plants. Therefore, the skills were transferable to plants in the United States. As a result, many moved to Los Angeles during the 1970s. Unemployment increased from 25% in the 1970s to over 40% in the 1980s. Rural poverty was at 84% and urban poverty was at 47%. This was difficult for many impoverished Guatemalans, because many were reliant on the agricultural economy as their source of employment.

During the 1980s, many revolutionary/guerrilla groups merged together to become the Unidad Revolucionaria Nacional Guatemalteca (URNG); the Guatemalan government responded with military action, which included the genocide of 150,000 civilians during 1981 to 1983. Ultimately, this formed a ripple effect, which led to displacement and migration to both Mexico and the United States for many Guatemalans and Mayas. Mass migration from Guatemala occurred during the 1980s; as a result, changing the relationship with the United States. During this time, Guatemala was experiencing high levels of poverty along with social and political unrest. Guatemalans sought refuge during the 1980s due to civil war and economic devastation. However, at the time, they were not granted asylum. Despite, this female asylum-seekers have been able to receive asylum since then. Femicide has become more prevalent in Guatemala. In this manner, many United States courts have been granting asylum due to the increase in femicide in Guatemala.

The Immigration Reform and Control Act (IRCA) was passed in the United States in 1986. Following IRCA, most documented Guatemalan Americans were able to receive legal admission through the petitioning of family members already in the United States. Immigration Reform and Control Act (IRCA) disadvantaged incoming Guatemalan immigrants, because it allowed for documentation to those who entered prior to 1982; however, Guatemalan immigration largely took place after 1982.

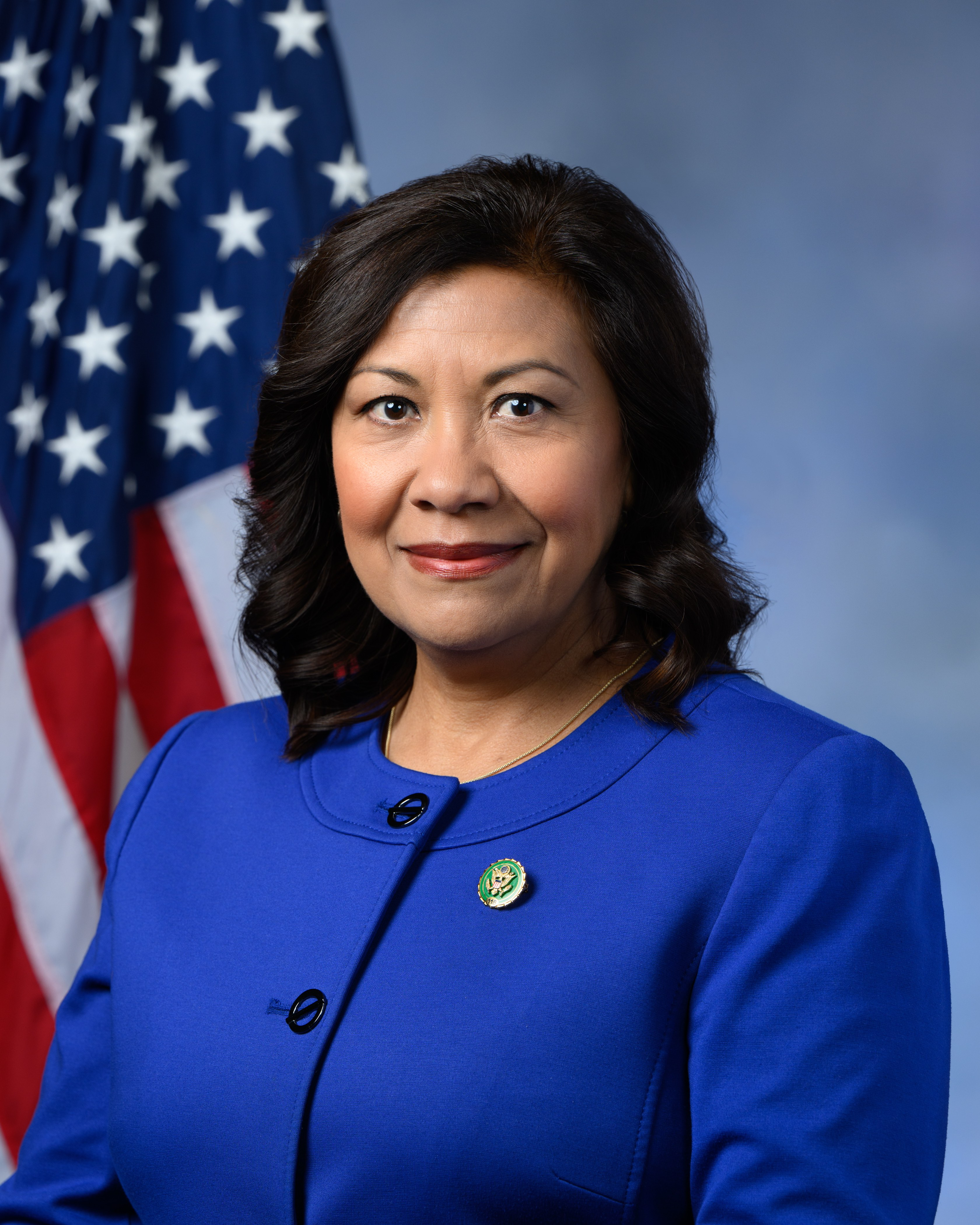
Norma Torres, member of the House of Representatives.

In 1997, immigration was further limited for Guatemalans through the Nicaraguan and Central American Relief Act. This act allowed Central American asylum-seekers to be documented in the United States but called for deportation for those undocumented. At the time, many of those people were Guatemalan Americans. Deportation of undocumented immigrants have consequences of socioeconomic mobility within Guatemala. Households in Guatemala that receive money from Guatemalans in the United States are able to pull themselves into a better economic standing. By contrast, households which lose that money experience downward mobility.

=== Literature in the U.S. ===
According to Rodriguez, the main themes of Central American literature in the United States are: war, violence, criminality, solidarity, migration, ethnicity, and the construction of identity. Maya Chinchilla is a Guatemalan poet of mixed U.S., German and Guatemalan heritages. In her poem "Central Americanamerican" she "diffracts the construction of Central American identity beyond a geographic notion and along the multiple coordinates of migrations, generations, heritages, languages, ethnicities, races, sexualities, cultures, and discourses magnified in the Central American diasporas." Novels like The Tattooed Soldier by Héctor Tobar display the cultural significance of Central American identity within U.S. multiculturalism.

== Culture ==
=== Guatemalan Mayas and Hispanics ===
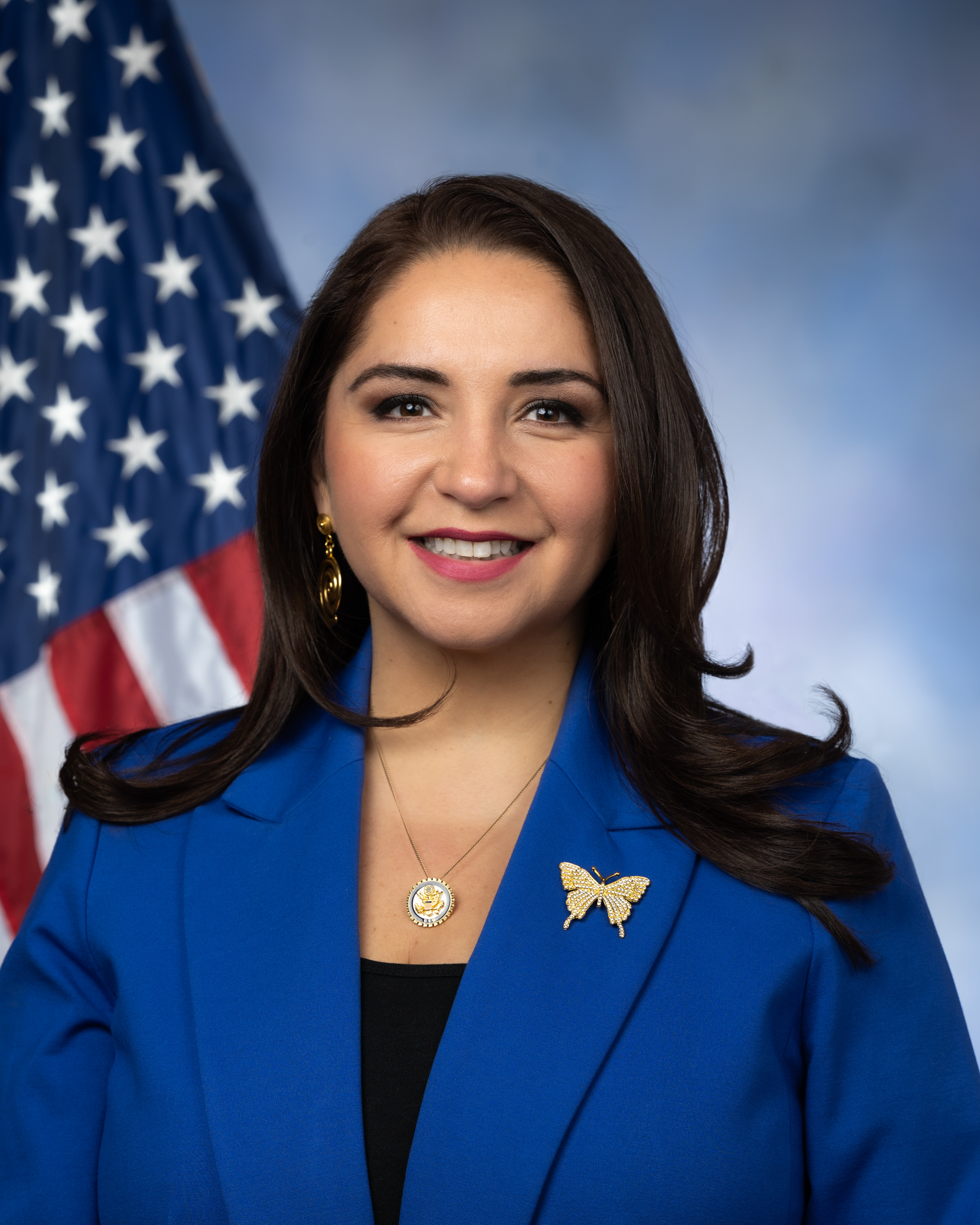
Delia Ramirez, US representative from Illinois' 3rd congressional district, first Latino to represent Illinois in Congress

Guatemalan Americans are a very culturally diverse group of people, including around 23 distinct ethnic groups, whose languages are different, although they maintain unique cultural traditions. The groups are, on the whole, Maya. The Ladino are a different group that speak the Spanish language and have Spanish culture. So, Guatemalan Americans are a multicultural community. This reason is why the assimilation processes, traditional beliefs, and customs vary differently between groups. Most Ladino Guatemalans living in the United States come from Jutiapa, Guatemala City, and Chiquimula. The majority of Ladinos from Jutiapa and Chiquimula live in the northeast, in states such as New Jersey and Massachusetts.

Immigrant Maya American communities have preserved their ethnic customs. The Guatemalans of European descent (mostly of Spanish ancestry) often mixed with other U.S. Hispanic groups. However, it is unknown the degree to which the transmission of cultural traditions between Guatemalans immigrants and their descendants occurs due to a lack of research.

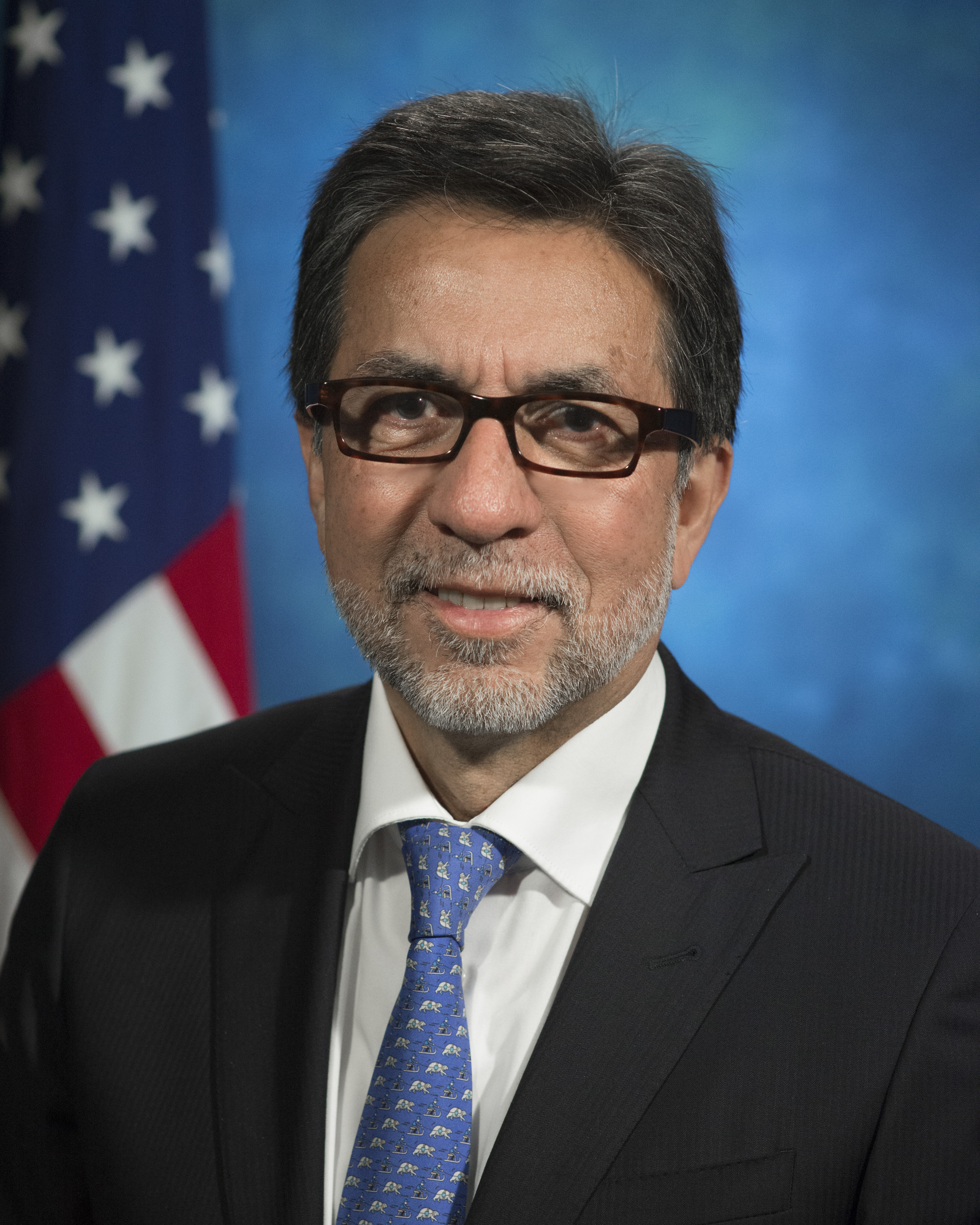
Luis E. Arreaga, former ambassador to Guatemala and Iceland

Some traditions have remained in most neighborhoods of Guatemalan immigrants, especially in Los Angeles, Houston and southern Florida, where Guatemalan traditions are being both transformed and lost due to American acculturation. Some Guatemalan traditions are the celebration of Quinceañeras, the formation of soccer leagues, and the Organization de las Fiestas de la Patronal (Organization of Patronal Parties).

There are over one million Maya Natives in the United States- largely from both Mexico and Guatemala. Despite this, the United States fails to recognize Maya Natives as refugees from Guatemala despite the political and social conditions that produce the need for immigration. Mayas are at the bottom of the social stratum in Guatemala. This can be accounted by racism within Guatemalan society, along with the vulnerability that is produced during migration to the United States through Mexico.

Maya Indian Organizations in the United States
Organization	Location
Corn Maya Organization	Jupiter, Florida
Guatemalan Maya Center	Lake Worth Beach, Florida
Summer Language Program	Los Angeles, California
Maya Vision	Los Angeles, California

=== Religion ===
Due largely to influences such as Spanish colonization and U.S. business involvement in Central America, the Indigenous religions of Guatemala have mixed to create a hybrid spirituality and emergent "spiritual forms, practices, and communities as these intersect with other aspects of Hispanic/a identity, such as ethnicity, race, gender and sexuality."

=== Cuisine ===
Guatemalan cuisine represents a relatively recent addition to the American culinary landscape, introduced by Guatemalan immigrants who sought refuge from the political instability that characterized Guatemala throughout the 1980s. Within the Guatemalan American community, several traditional dishes have achieved considerable popularity, including tamales, Pepián, Jocón, and Guatemalan hot dogs, commonly referred to as shuco.

== Socioeconomic mobility ==
Compared to the U.S. Hispanic population and U.S. population in total, Guatemalans are found to have significantly lower levels of educational attainment across the population. They are less likely than U.S. born citizens to earn a bachelor's degree, with only 9% of Guatemalans age 25 or older having received one in 2013. Despite this, studies demonstrate that Guatemalan Americans have one of the highest levels of participation within the work force. 31% of those Guatemalan Americans work within the service sector.

== Demographics ==
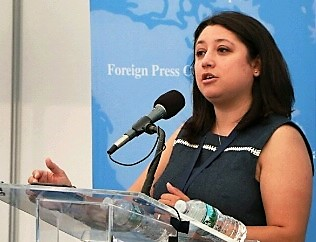
Pili Tobar served as White House Deputy Communications Director in the Biden administration.

Half of the Guatemalan population is situated in two parts of the country, the Northeast and Southern California. A combined population of 267,335 resides in Los Angeles, Orange, Riverside, San Bernardino, and San Diego counties. There is also a Guatemalan community in Las Vegas.

The Northeast megalopolis, extending from Northern Virginia to north of Boston, is home to a population of 257,729 Guatemalans. Cities such as Langley Park, Trenton, Stamford, Providence and Lynn have significant concentrations of Guatemalans along the corridor.

=== Distribution by state ===
State/Territory	Guatemalan Population 2020 census	Percent 2020	2010 census	Percent 2010
Alabama	26,614	0.5%	15,282	0.3%
Alaska	724	0.1%	508	0.0%
Arizona	22,713	0.3%	13,426	0.2%
Arkansas	9,428	0.3%	4,533	0.2%
California	454,917	1.1%	332,737	0.9%
Colorado	14,362	0.2%	7,488	0.1%
Connecticut	26,660	0.7%	16,715	0.5%
Delaware	10,449	1.0%	5,202	0.6%
District of Columbia	3,743	0.5%	2,635	0.4%
Florida	138,818	0.6%	83,882	0.4%
(Georgia (U.S. state)) Georgia	59,625	0.5%	36,874	0.4%
Hawaii	1,191	0.0%	565	0.0%
Idaho	2,529	0.2%	1,168	0.1%
Illinois	48,681	0.4%	35,321	0.3%
Indiana	14,937	0.2%	5,933	0.1%
Iowa	10,708	0.3%	4,917	0.2%
Kansas	11,496	0.3%	5,538	0.2%
Kentucky	12,514	0.2%	5,231	0.1%
Louisiana	12,270	0.2%	6,660	0.1%
Maine	783	0.0%	457	0.0%
Maryland	63,972	1.0%	34,491	0.6%
Massachusetts	53,437	0.7%	32,812	0.5%
Michigan	12,994	0.1%	8,428	0.1%
Minnesota	13,058	0.2%	6,754	0.1%
Mississippi	5,807	0.2%	2,978	0.1%
Missouri	11,079	0.1%	6,610	0.1%
Montana	401	0.0%	200	0.0%
Nebraska	18,548	0.9%	8,616	0.5%
Nevada	19,787	0.5%	13,407	0.5%
New Hampshire	1,242	0.1%	743	0.1%
New Jersey	79,638	0.8%	48,869	0.6%
New Mexico	3,859	0.2%	2,386	0.1%
New York	109,766	0.5%	73,806	0.4%
North Carolina	35,349	0.3%	20,206	0.2%
North Dakota	460	0.0%	134	0.0%
Ohio	20,084	0.1%	8,680	0.1%
Oklahoma	15,660	0.3%	7,960	0.2%
Oregon	14,809	0.3%	7,703	0.2%
Pennsylvania	23,280	0.2%	11,462	0.1%
Rhode Island	28,062	2.5%	18,852	1.8%
South Carolina	14,999	0.2%	8,883	0.2%
South Dakota	3,737	0.3%	1,620	0.2%
Tennessee	36,767	0.5%	14,323	0.2%
Texas	108,548	0.3%	66,244	0.3%
Utah	11,651	0.3%	6,877	0.2%
Vermont	309	0.0%	215	0.0%
Virginia	56,076	0.6%	33,556	0.4%
Washington	20,340	0.2%	9,520	0.1%
West Virginia	842	0.0%	347	0.0%
Wisconsin	5,015	0.1%	3,037	0.1%
Wyoming	683	0.1%	418	0.1%
Total U.S. Guatemalan Population	1,669,557	0.4%	1,044,209	0.3%

=== Cities (metro areas) with the largest Guatemalan populations ===
The largest population of Guatemalans are situated in the following areas (Source: 2020 ACS 5-Year Estimate):

1. Los Angeles-Long Beach-Santa Ana, CA MSA - 286,250
2. New York-Northern New Jersey-Long Island, NY-NJ-PA MSA - 125,231
3. Washington-Arlington-Alexandria, DC-VA-MD-WV MSA - 81,530
4. Miami-Fort Lauderdale-Pompano Beach, FL MSA - 66,829
5. Houston-Sugar Land-Baytown, TX MSA - 56,993
6. San Francisco-Oakland-Fremont, CA MSA - 51,626
7. Riverside-San Bernardino-Ontario, CA MSA - 42,457
8. Chicago-Joliet-Naperville, IL-IN-WI MSA - 38,872
9. Boston-Cambridge-Quincy, MA-NH MSA - 36,709
10. Atlanta-Sandy Springs-Marietta, GA MSA - 35,917
11. Dallas-Fort Worth-Arlington, TX MSA - 27,950
12. Providence-New Bedford-Fall River, RI-MA MSA - 27,588
13. Las Vegas-Paradise, NV MSA - 17,575
14. Phoenix-Mesa-Glendale, AZ MSA - 16,892
15. San Diego-Carlsbad-San Marcos, CA MSA - 13,572
16. Philadelphia-Camden-Wilmington, PA-NJ-DE-MD MSA - 13,563
17. Trenton-Princeton, NJ MSA - 15,457
18. Bridgeport-Stamford-Norwalk, CT MSA - 15,417
19. Baltimore-Towson, MD MSA - 10,401
20. Cincinnati, OH-KY-IN MSA - 9,147

=== U.S. communities with largest population of people of Guatemalan ancestry ===
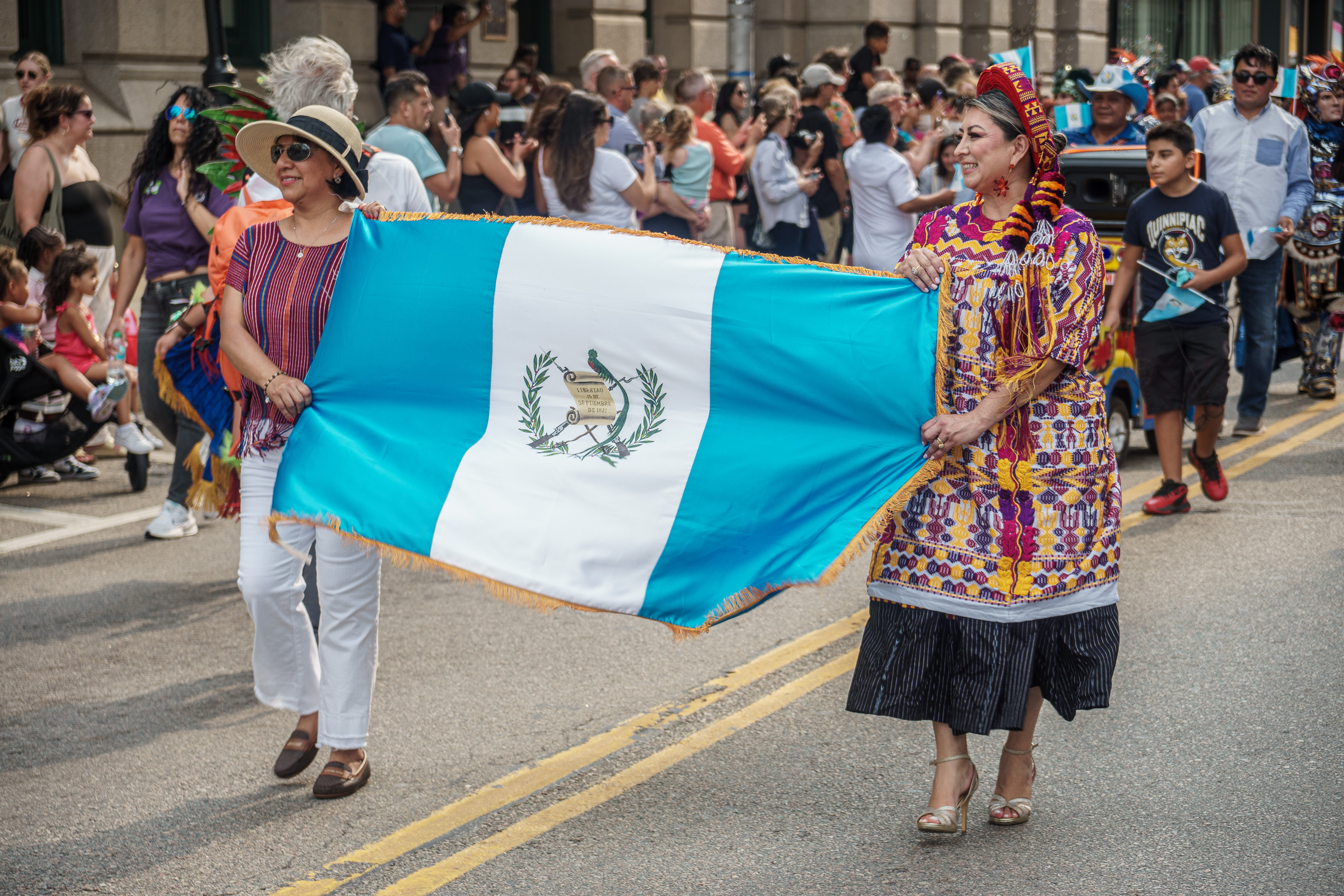
Guatemalan Center of New England at a parade in Providence, Rhode Island

The top 25 U.S. communities with the highest populations of Guatemalans (Source: Census 2020)

1. Los Angeles, CA – 157,676
2. New York City, NY – 42,499
3. Houston, TX – 33,210
4. Chicago, IL – 20,885
5. Providence, RI – 15,332
6. Oakland, CA – 13,492
7. Trenton, NJ – 13,323
8. Phoenix, AZ – 11,181
9. Lynn, MA – 10,615
10. Stamford, CT – 10,221
11. San Rafael, CA – 8,876
12. San Francisco, CA – 7,870
13. Oklahoma City, OK – 7,842
14. Langley Park, MD – 7,546
15. Lake Worth Beach, FL – 7,317
16. Plainfield, NJ – 6,958
17. Dallas, TX – 6,641
18. Long Beach, CA – 6,522
19. West Palm Beach, FL – 5,542
20. Palmdale, CA – 5,509
21. Las Vegas, NV – 5,134
22. Boston, MA – 4,871
23. Hawthorne, CA – 4,681
24. Miami, FL – 4,545
25. Inglewood, CA – 4,172

=== U.S. communities with high percentages of people of Guatemalan ancestry ===
The top 25 U.S. communities with the highest percentages of Guatemalans as a percentage (Source: Census 2010):

1. Marydel, Maryland - 42.55%
2. Brewster, New York - 38.16%
3. Indiantown, Florida – 37.15%
4. Templeville, Maryland – 31.88%
5. Georgetown, Delaware – 31.86%
6. Chamblee, Georgia – 30.89%
7. Henderson, Maryland – 29.45%
8. Langley Park, Maryland – 26.81%
9. Ellijay, Georgia – 19.39%
10. Lake Worth Beach, Florida – 18.66%
11. Collinsville, Alabama – 18.51%
12. East Ellijay, Georgia – 18.31%
13. Mount Kisco, New York – 16.38%
14. Fairview, New Jersey – 15.84%
15. Schuyler, Nebraska – 13.99%
16. Saluda, South Carolina – 13.74%
17. Central Falls, Rhode Island – 13.28%
18. Greenport, New York – 13.06%
19. Carthage, Missouri – 12.80%
20. Tice, Florida – 12.70%
21. Stuart, Florida – 12.62%
22. Stacy Street, Florida – 12.59%
23. Modest Town, Virginia – 11.41%
24. Trion, Georgia – 10.84%
25. Monterey, Tennessee – 10.77%

== Notable people ==
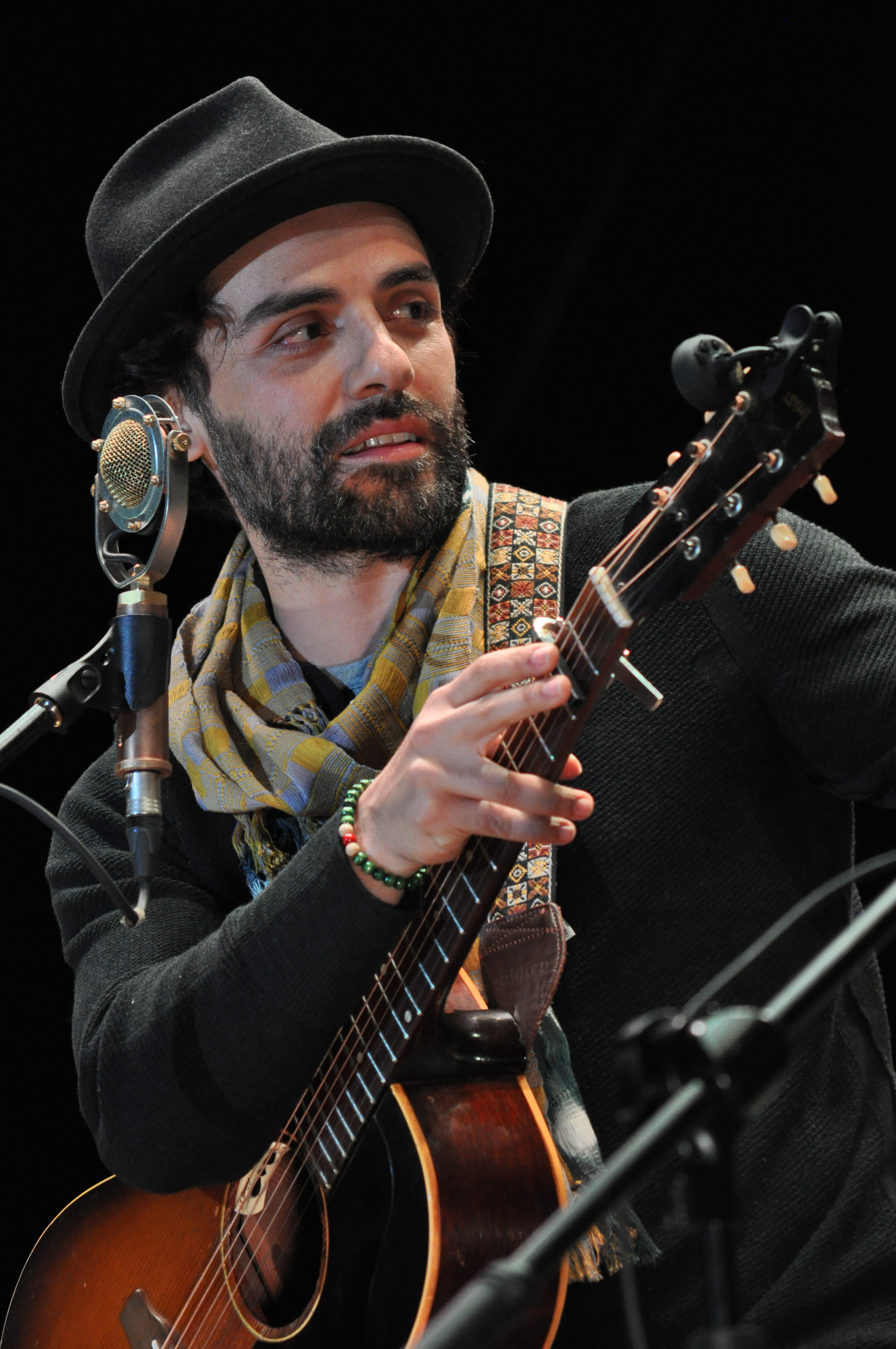
Oscar Isaac performing at Universidad Francisco Marroquín, February 2015.

- Adria Arjona – Puerto Rican actress of Guatemalan descent
- Luis E. Arreaga – American diplomat and United States Ambassador in Guatemala and Iceland.
- Luis von Ahn – Entrepreneur and an associate professor in the Computer Science Department at Carnegie Mellon University.
- Joseph Baena – American actor, bodybuilder, fitness model and real estate agent. Son of Hollywood actor, Arnold Schwarzenegger. Of Guatemalan descent from his mother's side.
- Aston Matthews – American hip hop artist from Los Angeles, California.
- Luis Beza – American trumpet player for third-wave ska band Suburban Legends.
- David Campos – Guatemalan-American attorney and member of the San Francisco Board of Supervisors representing District 9.
- Elias Coop-Gonzalez – politician
- René Corado – Guatemalan-American ornithologist and writer.
- Colman Domingo – American actor of Guatemalan descent
- Ricky Duran – Guatemalan-American recording artist. Runner-up of season 17 of the American talent competition The Voice.
- David Estrada – of Guatemalan descent.
- Francisco Goldman – American novelist, journalist, and Allen K. Smith Professor of Literature and Creative Writing. He is son of a Guatemalan Catholic mother and Jewish-American father.
- Anthony Gonzalez – American actor.
- José Antonio Gutiérrez – US Marine Lance Corporal. First US Marine to be killed in action in the Iraq War.
- Ted Hendricks – Guatemalan born, former American football linebacker who logged 15 seasons for the Baltimore Colts (1969–73), the Green Bay Packers (1974) and the Oakland and Los Angeles Raiders (1975–83) in the National Football League.
- Oscar Isaac – Guatemalan born American raised actor and singer.
- Lefty Gunplay – American rapper.
- Manny Marroquin – Grammy winning mixing engineer. Guatemalan born, his family moved to Los Angeles when he was nine due to the Guatemalan Civil War.
- Benito Martinez – American actor most known for his role as police captain (later city councilman) David Aceveda in the television series The Shield.
- Luisa Moreno – Social Activist and participant in the United States labor movement.
- Arquímides Ordóñez – Soccer player of Guatemalan descent.
- Delia Ramirez – American politician born to Guatemalan immigrant parents.
- Rubio Rubin – American soccer player of Guatemalan and Mexican descent.
- AraabMuzik – American hip hop record producer of Dominican and Guatemalan descent.
- KC Porter – American record producer, singer-songwriter, musician.
- Bridget Powers – American hardcore pornographic actress.
- Tony Revolori – Guatemalan American actor (Spider-Man: Homecoming and Spider-Man: Far From Home).
- Pam Rodriguez – American glamour model of Guatemalan and Puerto Rican descent.
- Devorah Rose – Guatemalan/Venezuelan American socialite.
- Juana Samayoa – Guatemalan-American actress and television presenter.
- Gadi Schwartz – NBC News correspondent
- Willie Sims – Guatemalan born, American raised soccer player.
- Ryan Spilborghs – American professional baseball outfielder in the Texas Rangers organization.
- Héctor Tobar – Los Angeles author and journalist.
- Norma Torres – Politician. She is Guatemalan born but American raised.
- Lily Wu – Mayor of Wichita, Kansas
- Daphne Zuniga – American actress (Melrose Place, One Tree Hill and Spaceballs). Her father was originally from Guatemala.

== See also ==
- Guatemala–United States relations
- History of Central Americans in Los Angeles

== Sources ==
- Jonas, Susanne; Rodríguez, Nestor (2015). Guatemala-U.S. Migration. doi:10.7560/760608. ISBN 978-0-292-76315-9.
