= René Corado =

Guatemalan oologist and writer

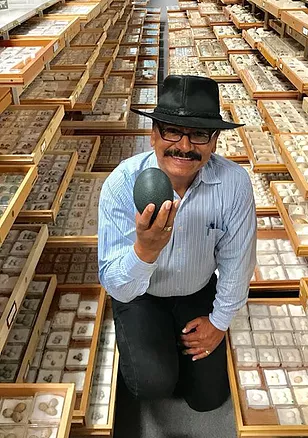
Corado with some of his eggs.

René Corado (born 1960) is a Guatemalan-American oologist, biologist and writer.

== Biography ==
Corado was born in a small village of El Chicał, Morazan, El Progreso, Guatemala among six siblings. In 1968, at age 8, Corado and his family moved to Guatemala City. He attended school in the morning and to help his family survive, he shined shoes in the afternoon and asked for leftovers to feed his siblings. Some days he did not collect enough food and visited the dump to look for food for himself. In 1981, Corado emigrated to the United States. He went to Hollywood, where he started as a gardener for the Donald L. Bleitz Wildlife Foundation in 1982. Bleitz died in 1986 and requested that all study skins go to the Western Foundation of Vertebrate Zoology, which became the largest egg and nest collection in the world, founded by Ed Harrison in 1956. Corado worked alongside Harrison, building his knowledge of oology and collaborating on ornithological research.

Corado graduated from high school in the U.S. He earned an associate degree from Oxnard College in 2007.

In 2001, Corado started a bird conservation project in Guatemala. By 2004, with the help of Linnea Hall and the support of Western Foundation of Vertebrate Zoology he created a campaign called the Guatemala River Project to work towards cleaning the heavily polluted Motagua River. He and Hall collaborated on publications such as Egg & Nest, which emphasizes the diversity that can be found in bird eggs and nests.

In 2014, his autobiographical book, El Lustrador (The Shoeshine Boy), was published in Guatemala.

In 2016, he published his autobiographical book The Adventures of René Corado, The Shoeshine Boy, bilingual and illustrated.

In September 2019, he was honored as Guatemalan Ambassador of Peace.

On 11 November 2019 he was honored with the Order of the Quetzal. Established in 1936, it is bestowed by the Government of Guatemala. The award acknowledges officials of nations, organizations and other entities whose artistic, civic, humanitarian, or scientific works merit special recognition.

The WFVZ has more than a million bird eggs, eighteen thousand bird nests and fifty six thousand study skins (of birds).
