= John Hope Franklin Center for Interdisciplinary and International Studies =

Academic unit of Duke University

- Established: 2000 (renovation)
- Parent institution: Duke University
- Named for: John Hope Franklin
- Location: Central Campus
- Programs: Humanities, International studies, Technology, Human rights, Art
- Website: John Hope Franklin Center

The John Hope Franklin Center for Interdisciplinary and International Studies (JHFC) is located at Duke University in the United States. It is a consortium of programs dedicated to studying and revitalizing theories of how knowledge is gained and exchanged. The more than twenty participants come from a broad range of disciplines, converging to explore intellectual, social, and political issues, including race and race relations, the legacy of the African-American Experience, equality and opportunity amongst populations, and the implications of globalization. In essence, the Center's mission is to facilitate the interactions of humanists and others involved in the social sciences in an intellectual setting amenable to diverse partnerships.

== About ==
The Franklin Center is named after Dr. John Hope Franklin, the James B. Duke Professor Emeritus of History and former professor of Legal History at Duke. An intellectual leader and lifelong civil rights activist, his work has inspired the Center's dedication to creative sharing of ideas and methodologies.

One essential aspect of the Franklin Center is its wholehearted embrace of new technologies and innovations to enhance intellectual exchange. Using resources such as multimedia and high-speed videoconferencing, the Center employs advanced technologies both as a means to share ideas and as an end, aware of the revolutionizing power of these innovations in education and society.

On the bus line and within walking distance to other parts of Duke's campuses, the Center is easily accessible to residents from the Durham and Triangle area, who are invited to participate in and experience workshops, lectures, exhibits, and other public events. A brown-bag lunch series--"Wednesday Conversations"—invites local residents and community leaders to share insights and expertise on matters of local and universal consequence. Past speakers have included professors from universities around the country as well as people from high-ranking positions in various foundations and associations.

== Consortium members ==
- African and African-American Studies Program
- Center for Asian and Asian American Studies
- Canadian Studies Center
- Center for European Studies
- Center for French and Francophone Studies
- Center for Global Studies and the Humanities
- Center for South Asia Studies
- Critical U.S. Studies
- Duke Islamic Studies Center
- Duke University Center for International Studies
- Information Science + Information Studies
- Interdisciplinary Studies @ Duke University
- John Hope Franklin Humanities Institute
- International Comparative Studies
- Kimberly J. Jenkins Chair for New Technologies in Society
- Korea Forum
- Latino/a Studies
- Policy and Organizational Management Program
- Program in Asian Security Studies
- Students of the World
- University Scholars Program

=== External members ===
- Duke University Press
- HASTAC
- John Hope Franklin Collection of African and African American Documentation
