= Judith Kelley =

Danish political scientist

Judith Green Kelley

3rd Dean of the Sanford School of Public Policy
- Incumbent
- Assumed office July 1, 2018
- Preceded by: Kelly D. Brownell

Personal details
- Born: April 16, 1967 (age 58) Copenhagen
- Education: Stanford University (BA); Harvard University (MPP, PhD)

Judith Green Kelley (born April 16, 1967) is a Danish-born American political scientist.

Judith Green Kelley is Kevin D. Gorter Professor of Public Policy and Political Science and, since January 2018, Dean of the Sanford School of Public Policy at Duke University. She received her BA from Stanford University in 1995, her MPP in Public Policy from Harvard University Kennedy School of Government in 1997, and her Ph.D. in Public Policy from Harvard University in 2001. She studies democracy promotion, human rights, and international influences on domestic politics. She is well known for her early work on conditionality and socialization, particularly the area of ethnic minority policies in connection with EU enlargement. More recently, she has pioneered research on election monitoring, producing new data and analysis that raises questions about its usefulness and effectiveness. Her newest work focuses on new tools of influence such as global governance indicators.

== Prizes, awards, and honors ==
- 2012: Induced as a Fellow of the Bass Society of Excellence in Scholarship and Teaching, Duke University
- 2013: Monitoring Democracy Co-Winner of the International Studies Association's Chadwick F. Alger Prize for the best book on the subject of international organization and multilateralism
- 2013: Monitoring Democracy named "One of Choice's Outstanding Academic Titles for @013"
- 2013: Winner of the 2013 Susan E. Tifft Undergraduate teaching and mentoring award, Duke University
- 2015: "Politics by Number: Indicators as Social Pressure in International Relations." American Journal of Political Science. January 2015. With Beth Simmons. Winner of a top ten Albie Award for the best writing on political economy in 2015.
- 2017: Scorecard Diplomacy: winner of a top ten Albie Award for the best writing on political economy in 2017.
- 2021: Elected as a fellow of the National Academy of Public Administration.

== Selected bibliography ==
- Monitoring Democracy: When International Election Observation Works and Why it Often Fails, Princeton University Press, 2012
- Ethnic Politics in Europe: The Power of Norms and Incentives Princeton University Press, 2004
- "Politics by Number: Indicators as Social Pressure in International Relations." American Journal of Political Science with Beth Simmons, 2014
- "D-Minus Elections: The Politics and Norms of International Election Observation." International Organization 63.4, 1527–1556, 2009
- "Assessing the complex evolution of norms: the rise of international election monitoring." 2008. International Organization, 62(2): 221–55.
- "Who Keeps International Commitments and Why? The International Criminal Court and Bilateral Non-Surrender Agreements." 2007. American Political Science Review, 101(3): 573–589.
- "International Actors on the Domestic Scene: Membership Conditionality and Socialization by International Institutions." International Organization, Vol. 58(3), 2004, 459-459.
