= Rebecca Puhl =

American researcher

Rebecca M. Puhl is a researcher in the field of weight bias.

Puhl received her bachelor's degree from Queen's University in Canada in 1999. She then attended Yale University, where she received her Master's Degree in psychology in 2001 and her Ph.D. in Clinical Psychology in 2004. At the University of Connecticut, Puhl is a Board of Trustees Distinguished Professor in the Department of Human Development and Family Sciences and deputy director of the Rudd Center for Food Policy and Health.

Puhl's scholarship focuses on weight-based bullying, discrimination and bias. Her research examines the health effects of weight bias and works to develop evidence-based approaches to reduce its harmful effects. Additionally, she routinely testifies in state legislative hearings on weight discrimination.

Throughout the course of her career, Puhl has authored over 220 peer-reviewed studies and been cited over 51,000 times, with an h-index of 94. This work led to her being named to the Clarivate list of the world's most highly cited researchers in 2021.

In 2018, Puhl was the recipient of The Obesity Society Scientific Achievement Award, which recognizes excellence in an established research career. In 2021, she was the recipient of the Distinguished Lecturer Award for Obesity Canada. Her scholarship has been recognized with multiple awards from the University of Connecticut.
