= Carol Chomsky =

American linguist and education specialist (1930–2008)

- Born: Carol Doris Schatz; July 1, 1930; Philadelphia, Pennsylvania, U.S.
- Died: December 19, 2008 (aged 78); Lexington, Massachusetts, U.S.
- Education: University of Pennsylvania (BA); Harvard University (PhD)
- Occupation: Linguist
- Spouse: Noam Chomsky (m. 1949)
- Children: 3, including Aviva

Carol Doris Chomsky (née Schatz; July 1, 1930 – December 19, 2008) was an American linguist and education specialist who studied language acquisition in children.

== Early life ==
Carol Doris Schatz was born in Philadelphia on July 1, 1930. She married Noam Chomsky in 1949 with the two having known each other since she was five years old and he was seven. Her mother had been a teacher at a Hebrew school where his father was the principal. She was awarded a bachelor's degree in French from the University of Pennsylvania in 1951.

The couple spent time living in HaZore'a, a kibbutz in Israel. "When they were young and they were on the kibbutz, she wanted to drive a tractor or be a mechanic," Judith Chomsky said. "Now, the kibbutz wasn't quite ready for that. It was way before there were even words about women's rights." For various reasons, the Chomskys decided not to stay. They ended up in the Boston area, where he joined the faculty of MIT and they raised their three children. Despite Carol's interest in becoming a mechanic or driving a tractor at the time of the young couple's stay in 1953, they returned to the United States.

== Career ==
She earned a doctoral degree in linguistics from Harvard University in 1968, having attended the school in order to ensure that she would be able to make a living in the event that her husband were sent to jail for his active opposition to the Vietnam War.

Carol Chomsky's best-known book is The Acquisition of Syntax in Children From 5 to 10 (1969). The book investigated how children develop an understanding of the underlying grammatical structure of their native language, as well as how they use this skill to interpret sentences of increasing complexity as they get older. Despite earlier scientific beliefs that children complete their acquisition of syntax by the age of five, Chomsky's research showed that children continue to develop the skills needed to understand complex constructions beyond that age.

As part of her research to understand how children develop the ability to read, she developed a method in the late 1970s called repeated reading, in which children would read a text silently while a recording of the text was played. The child would repeat the process until the text could be read fluently without the tape. Research showed that four readings accompanied by a recording could be enough to provide added reading fluency for most children. More than 100 studies have been performed on the technique, with most finding statistically significant improvements in reading speed and word recognition.

She served on the faculty of the Harvard Graduate School of Education from 1972 until 1997.

== Death ==
Chomsky died of cancer on December 19, 2008, at her home in Lexington, Massachusetts. She was 78 years old.

== Publications ==
- The acquisition of syntax in children from 5 to 10, 1968
- Imparare la sintassi : uno studio con bambini di scuola elementare, 1978
- M-ss-ng l-nks : young people's literature, 1982
- M-ss-ng l-nks : a game of letters and language, 1983
- M-ss-ng l-nks : classics old and new, 1983
- M-ss-ng l-nks : microencyclopedia, 1984
