= Kelly D. Brownell =

American psychologist

Kelly David Brownell
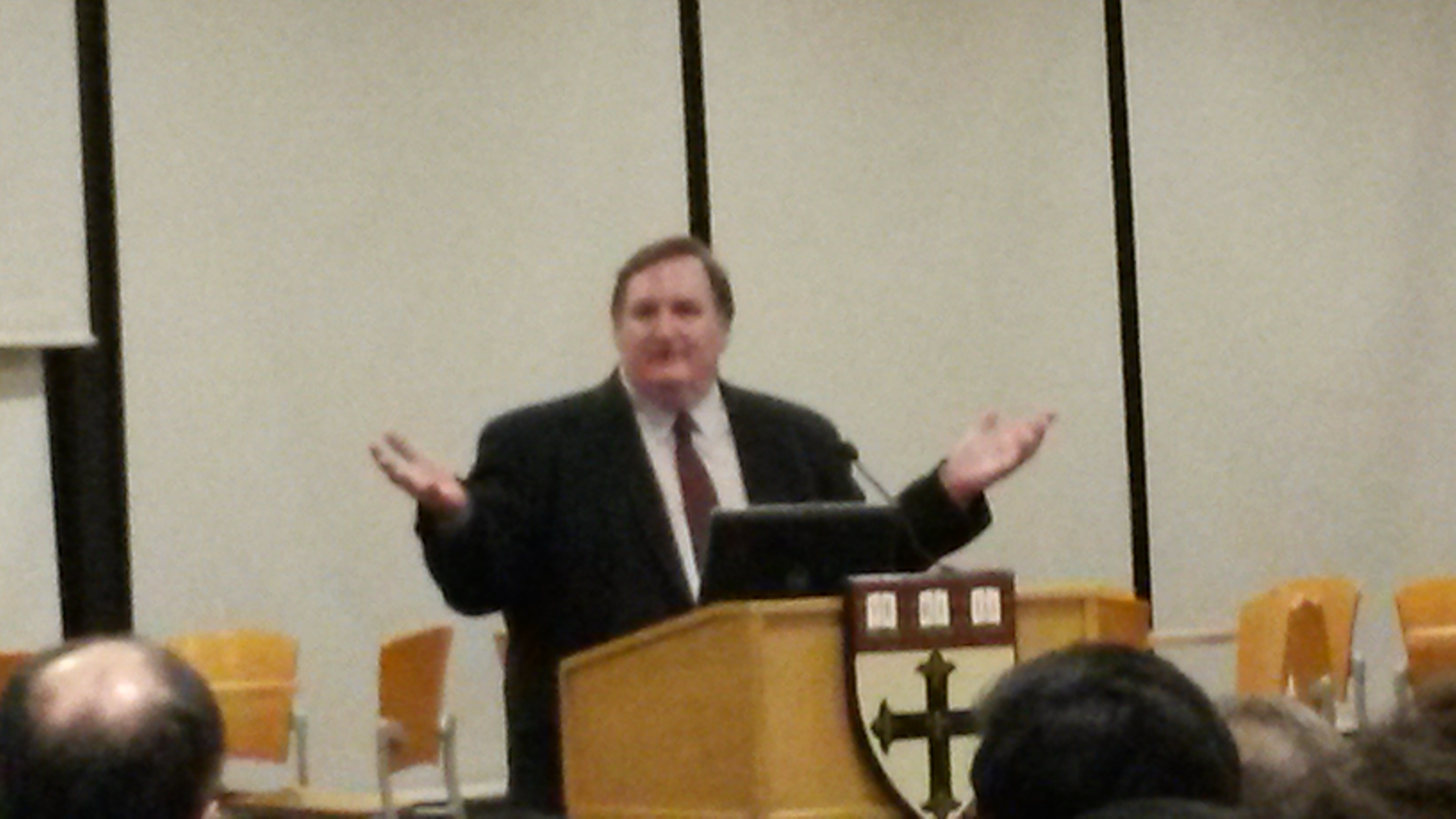

2nd Dean of the Sanford School of Public Policy
- In office July 1, 2013 – July 1, 2018
- Preceded by: Bruce R. Kuniholm
- Succeeded by: Judith Kelley

Personal details
- Born: October 31, 1951 (age 75) Indiana, United States
- Education: Purdue University (BS); Rutgers University (MS, PhD)

Kelly David Brownell (born October 31, 1951) is an American clinical psychologist and scholar of public health and public policy at Duke University whose work focuses on obesity and food policy. He is a former dean of Duke's Sanford School of Public Policy. Noted for his research dealing primarily with obesity prevention, as well as the intersection of behavior, environment, and health with public policy, Brownell advised former First Lady Michelle Obama's initiatives to address childhood obesity and has testified before Congress. He is credited with coining the term "yo-yo dieting", and was named as one of "The World's 100 Most Influential People" by Time Magazine in 2006.

== Personal background ==
Brownell was born in 1951 and was raised in Indiana. After receiving his Bachelor of Science degree in psychology from Purdue University in 1973, he was awarded a Ph.D in Psychology from Rutgers University in 1977. His advisor was Oscar Krisen Buros Professor G. Terence Wilson.

Kelly D. Brownell
- Known for: Research in obesity and prevention; food marketing, advertising, and legislation; sugary drink tax laws and legislation; public health policy
- Awards: James McKeen Cattell Award for Outstanding Dissertation in Psychology, New York Academy of Sciences; Distinguished Alumni Award, Purdue University; Lifetime Achievement Award, American Psychological Association
- Scientific career
- Fields: Psychology, Epidemiology, Neuroscience, Public Health
- Workplaces: Duke University; World Food Policy Center; Sanford School of Public Policy; Rudd Center for Food Policy and Obesity
- Thesis: The Effect of Spouse Training and Partner Cooperativeness in the Behavioral Treatment of Obesity (1977)
- Doctoral advisor: G. Terence Wilson
- Website: https://sanford.duke.edu/people/faculty/brownell-kelly-d

== Career ==
In 1977, Brownell became a member of the faculty at the University of Pennsylvania's medical school. He began as an assistant professor of psychology in psychiatry, was subsequently promoted to associate professor, and finally to full professor. During this period, he also served one year as a visiting scientist at the National Institutes of Health (NHI) National Cancer Institute (NCI).

In 1991, he joined Yale University, where he held positions as the James Rowland Angell professor of psychology, professor of epidemiology and public health, director of the Rudd Center for Food Policy and Obesity, chair of the department of psychology, and head of the undergraduate dormitory Silliman College.

Brownell left Yale in 2013 to join Duke University as Dean of its Sanford School of Public Policy, in which role he continued until the end of the 2018 academic year. He holds academic appointments as the Robert L. Flowers Professor of Public Policy, Professor of Psychology and Neuroscience, Director of the World Food Policy Center, and is a faculty affiliate of the Duke Global Health Institute.

In 2017, backed by funding from the Duke Endowment, William R. Kenan Jr. Charitable Trust, and Blue Cross and Blue Shield of North Carolina Foundation, Duke University announced the formation of its new World Food Policy Center (WFPC), based at the Sanford School of Public Policy. Brownell is the center's founder and director.

To date, he has authored 15 books and more than 350 scientific articles, papers, and chapters. He has also contributed to mainstream media outlets.

Brownell was previously president of the Society of Behavioral Medicine; Association for the Advancement of Behavior Therapy; and American Psychological Association, Division 38: Society for Health Psychology.

== Impact ==
Brownell's 1986 paper, Understanding and Preventing Relapse, published in American Psychologist, was recognized at the time as one of the most frequently cited papers in psychology.

Recognized for introducing the idea of food taxes as a means of improving public health in 1994, his work on soda taxes has been used by cities, states, and countries seeking to implement them as a public policy tool and tax revenue strategy. In commentary for Time Magazine's "Time 100 of 2006", former Arkansas governor and presidential candidate Mike Huckabee commented that Brownell had "helped set the U.S. agenda by calling for a ban on sweetened-cereal ads aimed at kids and a tax on high-fat, low-nutrition food."

Brownell has also influenced popular culture. In addition to having coined the term "yo-yo dieting", he is also credited with introducing the phrase "toxic food environment" in his 2004 book, Food Fight: The Inside Story of the Food Industry. A frequent radio and television guest, he is the host of the Policy 360 podcast, and has appeared in a variety of feature films and documentaries:

- Super Size Me, feature film, 2004
- Big Mac: Inside the McDonald's Empire, television documentary, 2007
- Killer at Large, documentary, 2008
- The Weight of the Nation, HBO documentary, 2012
- Fed Up, feature film, 2014
- Sustainable, feature film, 2016

== Awards and honors ==
- Distinguished Alumni Award, Purdue University, 2001
- Elected member, Institute of Medicine, 2005
- Elected member, Connecticut Academy of Science and Engineering, 2006
- Research to Practice Dissemination Award, Society of Behavioral Medicine, 2007
- Graduate School Award for a Lifetime of Distinguished Accomplishments and Service, Rutgers University, 2008
- Person of the Year, New Haven Register, 2009
- Atkinson-Stern Award for Distinguished Public Service, The Obesity Society, 2010
- Distinguished Scientific Award for the Applications of Psychology, American Psychological Association, 2012
- Lifetime Achievement Award, American Psychological Association, 2012
- The World's Most Influential Scientific Minds, Highly Cited Researchers, Thomson Reuters, 2014, 2015
- David P. Rall Award for Public Health Advocacy, American Public Health Association, 2014
- Joseph Priestley Award, Dickinson College, 2017

The Sanford School of Public Policy's Brownell-Whetten Diversity and Inclusion Award was established in 2016 to recognize the work of Brownell and fellow professor, Kate Whetten.

== Selected works ==
- Behavioral Medicine and Women: A Comprehensive Handbook, ISBN 978-1572305229
- Eating, Body Weight, and Performance in Athletes: Disorders of Modern Society ISBN 978-0812114744
- Eating Disorders and Obesity, Third Edition: A Comprehensive Handbook, ISBN 978-1462529063
- Food and Addiction: A Comprehensive Handbook, ISBN 978-0-19-973816-8
- Handbook of Eating Disorders: Psychology, Physiology, And Treatment, ISBN 978-0465028627
- Weight Bias: Nature, Consequences, and Remedies, ISBN 978-1593851996

== See also ==
- Criticism of fast food
- Fat tax
- Relapse prevention
