= Steve Striffler =

American anthropologist

Steve Striffler is an American anthropologist. He is director of the Labor Resource Center at the University of Massachusetts Boston.

In 1989, Striffler received a BA in political science from UCLA. In 1991, he received a MA in political science from the University of Michigan. In 1994, he received a MA in anthropology, New School for Social Research. In 1998, He received a PhD in anthropology from the New School for Social Research.

== Books ==
- Solidarity: Latin America and the US Left in the Era of Human Rights (Pluto Press, 2019)
- with Thomas Adams Working in the Big Easy: The History and Politics of Labor in New Orleans (University of Louisiana Press, 2014)
- with Carlos de la Torre The Ecuador Reader: History, Culture, Politics (Duke University Press, 2009)
- with Aviva Chomsky and Garry Leech The People Behind Colombian Coal: Mining, Multinationals, and Human Rights (Casa Editorial Pisando Callos, 2007)
- Chicken: The Dangerous Transformation of America's Favorite Food (Yale University Press, 2005)
- with Mark Moberg Banana Wars: Power, Production and History in the Americas (Duke University Press, 2003)
- In the Shadows of State and Capital: United Fruit, Popular Struggle, and Agrarian Restructuring in Ecuador, 1900-1995 (Duke University Press, 2002)
