= Duke University Center for International Studies =

The Duke University Center for International Studies (DUCIS) is an international studies national resource center housed within the John Hope Franklin Center for Interdisciplinary and International Studies on Duke University's west campus.

The current director is Gilbert W. Merkx. The executive director is Rob Sikorski.

== Languages ==
The Duke University Center for International Studies provides salary support for instruction in Persian, Polish, Romanian, Turkish and Wolof. It provides additional academic year and summer funding for students to study a wider range of critical languages including Arabic, Czech, Hungarian and Russian.

== Programs ==
DUCIS' public programs include the University Seminar on Global Governance and Democracy, a popular evening seminar series which draws speakers from across the globe, to present in-progress research on a variety of subjects, ranging from transnational banking trends, to regional election reform, to international concepts of justice.

The Duke University Center for International Studies is home to two national organizations: the Association of International Education Administrators and the Council of National Resource Centers.
