= Juana Samayoa =

American actress

Juana Samayoa (born 1948) is a Guatemalan-American actress and television presenter. She presented and produced News Talk for KBHK-TV from 1977-1982, and had played host to the heady days of battles over LGBT rights in San Francisco, with interviews with Harvey Milk (months before his assassination) and John Briggs on the Briggs Initiative.

Samayoa has two daughters.

== Credits ==
- Mission Movie (2004, as Antonia)
- Between Places
- Spider-Man: Homecoming
