= Food Fight: The Inside Story of the Food Industry =

2004 book by Kelly D. Brownell

- Paperback edition
- Author: Kelly D. Brownell
- Language: English
- Subject: Obesity
- Genre: Non-fiction
- Publisher: McGraw-Hill
- Publication date: September 16, 2004
- Publication place: United States
- Media type: Print
- Pages: 356 pp.
- ISBN: 0-071-43872-6

Food Fight: The Inside Story of the Food Industry, America's Obesity Crisis, & What We Can Do About It, published on September 16, 2004, by McGraw-Hill, was written by Kelly D. Brownell, Director of the Rudd Center for Food Policy and Obesity at Yale.

The book looks at the causes of the obesity epidemic in America and why the crisis is spreading overseas. The book claims to reveal both the roots of the problem and what might be done, exploring the convergence of human nature, public indifference, and capitalistic spirit that has transformed the American waistline and jeopardized the nation's health.

The authors critique the current culture of America, one that fosters a "toxic food environment" and promotes poor eating habits. The book also proposes public policy solutions for reversing the obesity trend and enabling individuals, families, and communities to adopt healthier diets.

== Two sides of the food fight ==
The book analyzes the two passionately divided sides of the current debate, or "food fight". One side argues that obesity, like smoking, is a public health crisis that demands governmental involvement in order to achieve a solution. Advocates of this viewpoint suggest that government use its legislative power to subsidize production of healthier foods, to regulate food industry practices, and to minimize the extent of junk food advertising to children. Brownell and Horgen support this side of the debate throughout their book.

The other side argues that weight is a matter of personal responsibility, and food choice should not be regulated by government in any capacity. Proponents of this viewpoint support prohibiting lawsuits against food companies and restaurants for their culpability in the obesity epidemic. Advocates of this viewpoint include lobbyists for the food industry.
