= Rudd Center for Food Policy and Health =

American non-profit organization

- Formation: 2005
- Type: Nonprofit organization
- Location: University of Connecticut, Hartford, Connecticut
- Director: Marlene Schwartz
- Deputy Director: Rebecca Puhl
- Key people: Kelly Brownell, former director
- Website: uconnruddcenter.org

The Rudd Center for Food Policy and Health, formerly named the Rudd Center for Food Policy and Obesity, is a non-profit research and public policy organization that promotes solutions to food insecurity, poor diet quality, and weight bias. Located in Hartford, Connecticut at The University of Connecticut, the Rudd Center was co-founded in March 2005 at Yale University by benefactor Leslie Rudd and Kelly D. Brownell. The Rudd Center moved from Yale to the University of Connecticut in December 2014.

== Weight bias and stigma ==
The Rudd Center's research and policy efforts aimed at reducing weight bias are led by Deputy Director Dr. Rebecca Puhl. Her work shows that 40% of U.S. adults have reported experiences of weight-based teasing, unfair treatment, and discrimination.

== Food marketing ==
In the United States, nearly $14 billion is spent per year on advertising by food, beverage, and restaurant companies, and much of this marketing promotes nutritionally poor foods.

The Rudd Center works to analyze these food marketing tactics and inform policy efforts to reduce unhealthy food marketing. Additionally, they seek to raise awareness about the ways in which food companies unfairly target children, teens, and communities of color.

== Economics and food security ==
The center focuses on the economic conditions underlying why certain demographics, primarily those that are less wealthy living in poorer areas, are subject to higher rates of obesity. The Center advocates policy to curb obesity by supporting legislation to regulate food labels and what children have access to in school zones.

Examples of economic policies that the Rudd Center has published research on include the Sugar-Sweetened Beverage Tax and the Child and Adult Care Food Program (CACFP.)

In addition to the Center's economic research, they also conduct research on food security in America. For example, the Center has published research on federal food assistance programs, non-governmental initiatives addressing food insecurity, and the charitable food system.

== Public policy and government ==
The Rudd Center seeks to actively engage policy and lawmakers to influence outcomes on food policy, school and community nutrition, and anti-obesity campaigns. It maintains a legislative database through which researchers can search proposed legislation that affects current food policy and legislation filed in Congress. For example, an October 23, 2012 policy brief outlined the state of sugary drink taxes.

== Schools, families and communities ==
Much of the Rudd Center's work focuses on childhood wellness and nutrition. For example, the Center has published over two dozen studies on school wellness systems and the benefits of providing universal free school meals.
