= Sanford School of Public Policy =

Public policy school of Duke University

Coordinates: 35°59′57.72″N 78°56′38.26″W

Duke University Sanford School of Public Policy
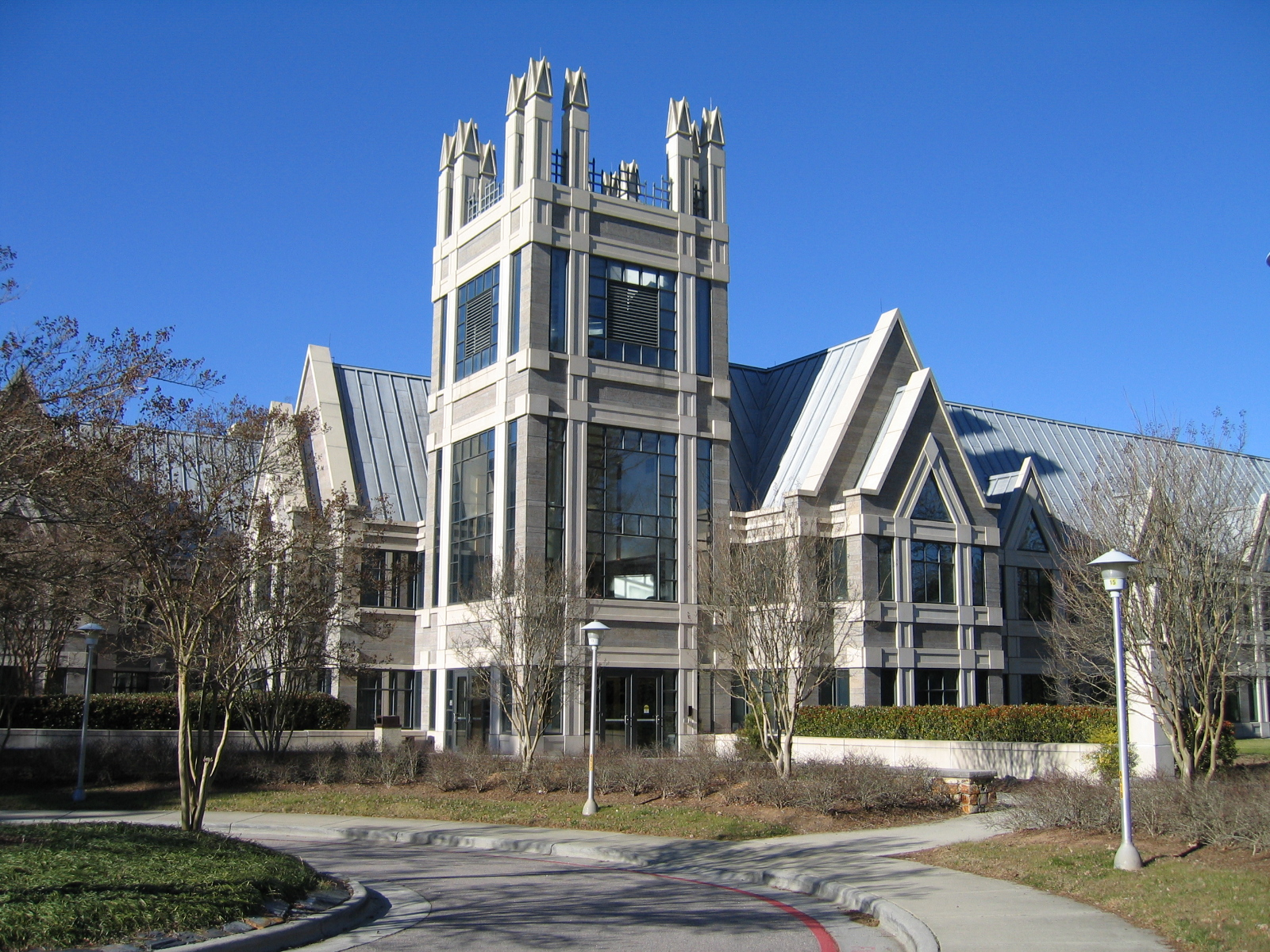
- Type: Private, public policy school
- Established: 1971
- Parent institution: Duke University
- Affiliations: APSIA
- Dean: JR DeShazo, Dean
- Named for: Terry Sanford
- Location: Durham, North Carolina, U.S.
- Programs: Government, leadership, ethics, journalism, international development
- Website: sanford.duke.edu

The Duke University Sanford School of Public Policy is the public policy school of Duke University, a private university in Durham, North Carolina.

The school was named after former Duke president and Governor of North Carolina Terry Sanford, who established the university's Institute for Policy Sciences and Public Affairs in 1971 as an interdisciplinary program geared toward training future leaders. When the School's current building on Duke's West Campus opened in 1994, the structure was named—and the Institute renamed—in honor of Sanford. The building was designed by Architectural Resources Cambridge, Inc. in a Modern Gothic style. The Sanford School offers bachelor's, master's, and doctoral programs in Public Policy.

A second building, named for principal benefactor David Rubenstein, opened in August 2005. The building houses several of the school's centers including the Duke Center for Child and Family Policy and the Duke Center for International Development. Rubenstein Hall had its formal dedication, which included a speech by former U.S. Secretary of State Colin Powell on November 4, 2005.

The Institute officially became Duke's tenth school on July 1, 2009, when it was renamed the Sanford School of Public Policy. JR DeShazo became Dean on July 1, 2026.

== Academic programs ==
=== Undergraduate ===
Sanford offers an undergraduate major in Public Policy Studies, a minor in Technology Policy, and a minor in Journalism and Media. The undergraduate program was slightly altered starting with the class of 2009. One aspect of the program that is unique among Duke's undergraduate majors is the requirement of a public policy-related summer internship.

=== Graduate ===
At the graduate level, the School currently offers the Master of Public Policy, Master of Public Affairs, Master of National Security Policy and Master of International Development Policy degrees. It also offers an international Master of Environmental Policy (iMEP) degree in collaboration with the Nicholas School of the Environment and Duke Kunshan University.

=== PhD ===
Sanford's PhD in Public Policy program is an interdisciplinary degree, with four concentrations available: Economics, Political Science, Psychology, and Sociology. The School also administers the University Program in Environmental Policy (UPEP) in partnership with the Nicholas School of the Environment.

== Centers and programs ==
The school's feature centers and programs are:

- Center for Child and Family Policy
- DeWitt Wallace Center for Media and Democracy
- Duke Center for International Development
- Duke Program in American Grand Strategy
- Hart Leadership Program
- Polis: Center for Politics
- Samuel and Ronnie Heyman Center for Ethics, Public Policy, and the Professions
- World Food Policy Center

== Rankings ==
Sanford is ranked 25th overall in the U.S. News & World Report 2026 Best Public Affairs Program list with the following specialty rankings:

- 3rd in Environmental Policy & Management
- 5th in Health Policy & Management
- 6th in Public Policy Analysis
- 6th in Social Policy
- 13th in International Global Policy
