= Utopia =

Imaginary community with desirable qualities

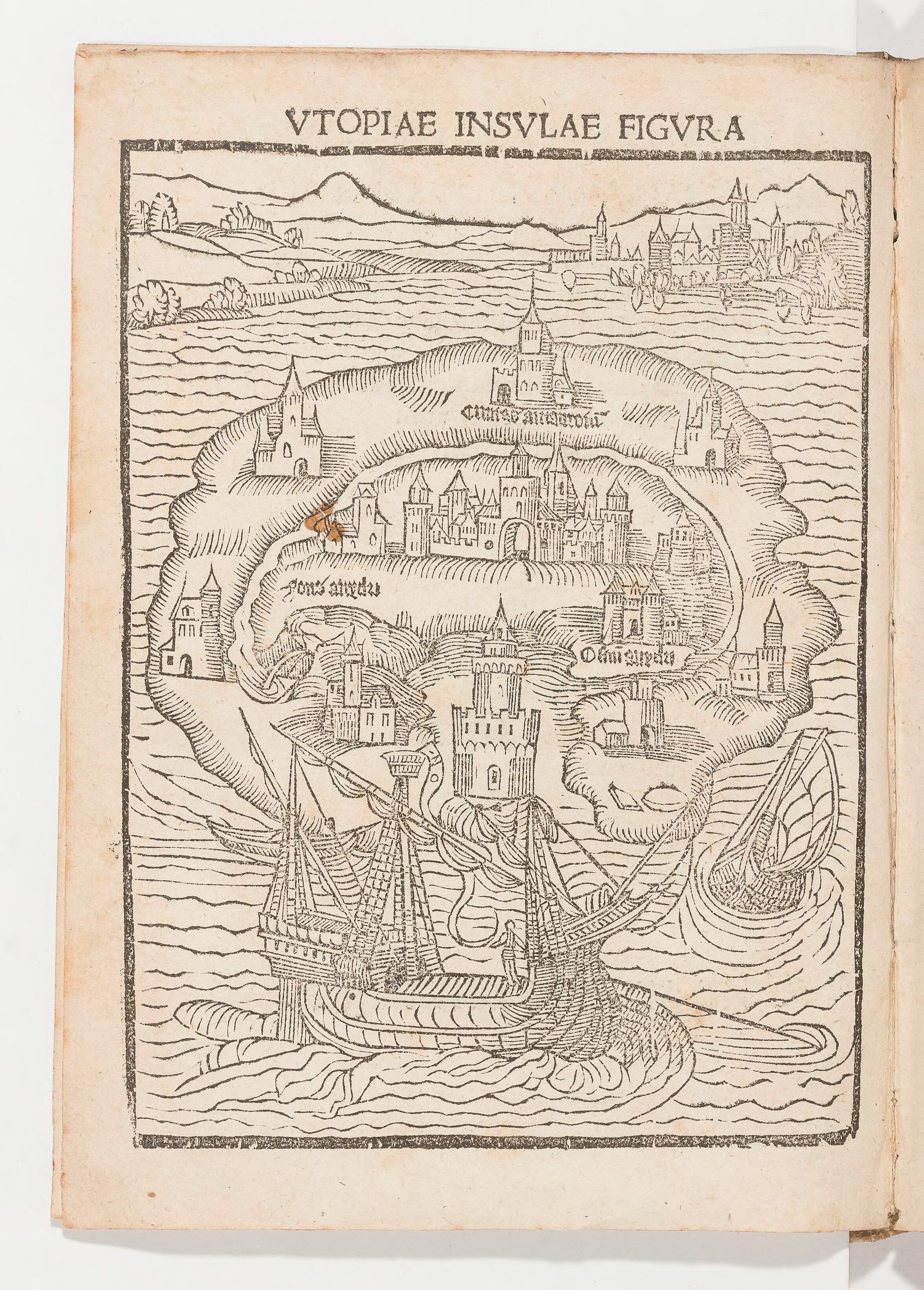
This is the woodcut for Utopia's map as it appears in Thomas More's Utopia printed by Dirk Martens in December 1516 (the first edition).

A utopia (/juːˈtoʊpiə/ yoo-TOH-pee-ə) is an imagined community or society that possesses highly desirable or near-perfect qualities for its residents. The term was coined by Sir Thomas More for his 1516 book Utopia, which describes a fictional island society in the New World, but some utopian visions predate it.

Hypothetical utopias and existing intentional communities that have utopian elements focus on, among other things, equality in the areas of economics, government and justice, with the method and structure of proposed implementation varying according to ideology. Lyman Tower Sargent argues that the nature of a utopia is inherently contradictory because societies are not homogeneous. Their members have desires that conflict and therefore cannot simultaneously be satisfied. To quote:

There are socialist, capitalist, monarchical, democratic, anarchist, ecological, feminist, patriarchal, egalitarian, hierarchical, racist, left-wing, right-wing, reformist, free love, nuclear family, extended family, gay, lesbian and many more utopias [ Naturism, Nude Christians, ...] Utopianism, some argue, is essential for the improvement of the human condition. But if used wrongly, it becomes dangerous. Utopia has an inherent contradictory nature here.

— Lyman Tower Sargent, Utopianism: A very short introduction (2010)

The opposite of a utopia is a dystopia. Utopian and dystopian fiction has become a popular literary category. Despite being common parlance for something imaginary, utopianism inspired and was inspired by some reality-based fields and concepts such as architecture, file sharing, social networks, universal basic income, communes, open borders, and even pirate bases.

== Etymology and history ==
The word utopia was coined in 1516 from Ancient Greek by the Englishman Sir Thomas More for his Latin text Utopia. It literally translates as "no place", coming from the Greek: οὐ ("not") and τόπος ("place"), and meant any non-existent society, when 'described in considerable detail'. However, in standard usage, the word's meaning has shifted and now usually describes a non-existent society that is intended to be viewed as considerably better than contemporary society.

In his original work, More carefully pointed out the similarity of the word to eutopia, meaning "good place", from Greek: εὖ ("good" or "well") and τόπος ("place"), which ostensibly would be the more appropriate term for the concept in modern English. The pronunciations of eutopia and utopia in English are identical, which may have given rise to the change in meaning. Dystopia, a term meaning "bad place" coined in 1868, draws on this latter meaning. The opposite of a utopia, dystopia is a concept which surpassed utopia in popularity in the fictional literature from the 1950s onwards, chiefly because of the impact of George Orwell's Nineteen Eighty-Four.

In 1876, writer Charles Renouvier published a novel called Uchronia (French Uchronie). The neologism, using chronos instead of topos, has since been used to refer to non-existent idealized times in fiction, such as Philip Roth's The Plot Against America (2004), and Philip K. Dick's The Man in the High Castle (1962).

According to the Philosophical Dictionary, proto-utopian ideas begin as early as the period of ancient Greece and Rome, medieval heretics, peasant revolts and establish themselves in the period of the early capitalism, reformation and Renaissance (Hus, Müntzer, More, Campanella), democratic revolutions (Meslier, Morelly, Mably, Winstanley, later Babeufists, Blanquists,) and in a period of turbulent development of capitalism that highlighted antagonisms of capitalist society (Saint-Simon, Fourier, Owen, Cabet, Lamennais, Proudhon and their followers).

== Definitions and interpretations ==
Famous quotes from writers and characters about utopia:

- "There is nothing like a dream to create the future. Utopia to-day, flesh and blood tomorrow." —Victor Hugo
- "A map of the world that does not include Utopia is not worth even glancing at, for it leaves out the one country at which Humanity is always landing. And when Humanity lands there, it looks out, and, seeing a better country, sets sail. Progress is the realisation of Utopias." —Oscar Wilde
- "Utopias are often only premature truths." —Alphonse de Lamartine
- "None of the abstract concepts comes closer to fulfilled utopia than that of eternal peace." —Theodor W. Adorno
- "I think that there is always a part of utopia in any romantic relationship." —Pedro Almodovar
- "In ourselves alone the absolute light keeps shining, a sigillum falsi et sui, mortis et vitae aeternae [false signal and signal of eternal life and death itself], and the fantastic move to it begins: to the external interpretation of the daydream, the cosmic manipulation of a concept that is utopian in principle." —Ernst Bloch
- "When I die, I want to die in a Utopia that I have helped to build." —Henry Kuttner
- "A man must be far gone in Utopian speculations who can seriously doubt that if these [United] States should either be wholly disunited, or only united in partial confederacies, the subdivisions into which they might be thrown would have frequent and violent contests with each other." —Alexander Hamilton, Federalist No. 6.
- "We are all utopians, so soon as we wish for something different." – Henri Lefebvre
- "Every daring attempt to make a great change in existing conditions, every lofty vision of new possibilities for the human race, has been labeled Utopian." –Emma Goldman

Utopian socialist Étienne Cabet in his utopian book The Voyage to Icaria cited the definition from the contemporary Dictionary of ethical and political sciences:

Utopias and other models of government, based on the public good, may be inconceivable because of the disordered human passions which, under the wrong governments, seek to highlight the poorly conceived or selfish interest of the community. But even though we find it impossible, they are ridiculous to sinful people whose sense of self-destruction prevents them from believing.

Marx and Engels used the word "utopia" to denote unscientific social theories.

Philosopher Slavoj Žižek told about utopia:

Which means that we should reinvent utopia but in what sense. There are two false meanings of utopia one is this old notion of imagining this ideal society we know will never be realized, the other is the capitalist utopia in the sense of new perverse desire that you are not only allowed but even solicited to realize. The true utopia is when the situation is so without issue, without the way to resolve it within the coordinates of the possible that out of the pure urge of survival you have to invent a new space. Utopia is not kind of a free imagination utopia is a matter of inner most urgency, you are forced to imagine it, it is the only way out, and this is what we need today.

Philosopher Milan Šimečka said:

...utopism was a common type of thinking at the dawn of human civilization. We find utopian beliefs in the oldest religious imaginations, appear regularly in the neighborhood of ancient, yet pre-philosophical views on the causes and meaning of natural events, the purpose of creation, the path of good and evil, happiness and misfortune, fairy tales and legends later inspired by poetry and philosophy ... the underlying motives on which utopian literature is built are as old as the entire historical epoch of human history.

Philosopher Richard Stahel said:

...every social organization relies on something that is not realized or feasible, but has the ideal that is somewhere beyond the horizon, a lighthouse to which it may seek to approach if it considers that ideal socially valid and generally accepted.

== Origins ==
In Plato's Republic, Socrates discusses existing regimes and imagines an ideal city named Kallipolis, ruled by a class of philosopher kings. The Republic sets out a system that would categorize citizens into a rigid class structure of "golden", "silver", and "bronze" classes. The golden citizens are trained in a rigorous 50-year-long educational program to be "philosopher kings". The city is designed to avoid both extreme wealth and poverty. The educational program for the rulers is the central notion of the proposal.

During the 16th century, Thomas More's book Utopia proposed an ideal society of the same name. More's utopia is inspired by Plato's Republic and Aristotle's Politics, and its seriocomic style from the dialogues of Lucian. Utopian socialists and other readers accept this imaginary society as the realistic blueprint for a working nation, while others have postulated that Thomas More intended nothing of the sort. Some say More's Utopia functions only on the level of a satire, a work intended to reveal more about the England of his time than about an idealistic society. This interpretation is bolstered by the title of the book and nation and its dual meaning between the Greek for "no place" and "good place": "utopia" is a compound of the syllable ou-, meaning "no" and topos, meaning place. But the homophonic prefix eu-, meaning "good", also resonates in the word, with the implication that the perfectly "good place" is really "no place".

== Mythical and religious utopias ==
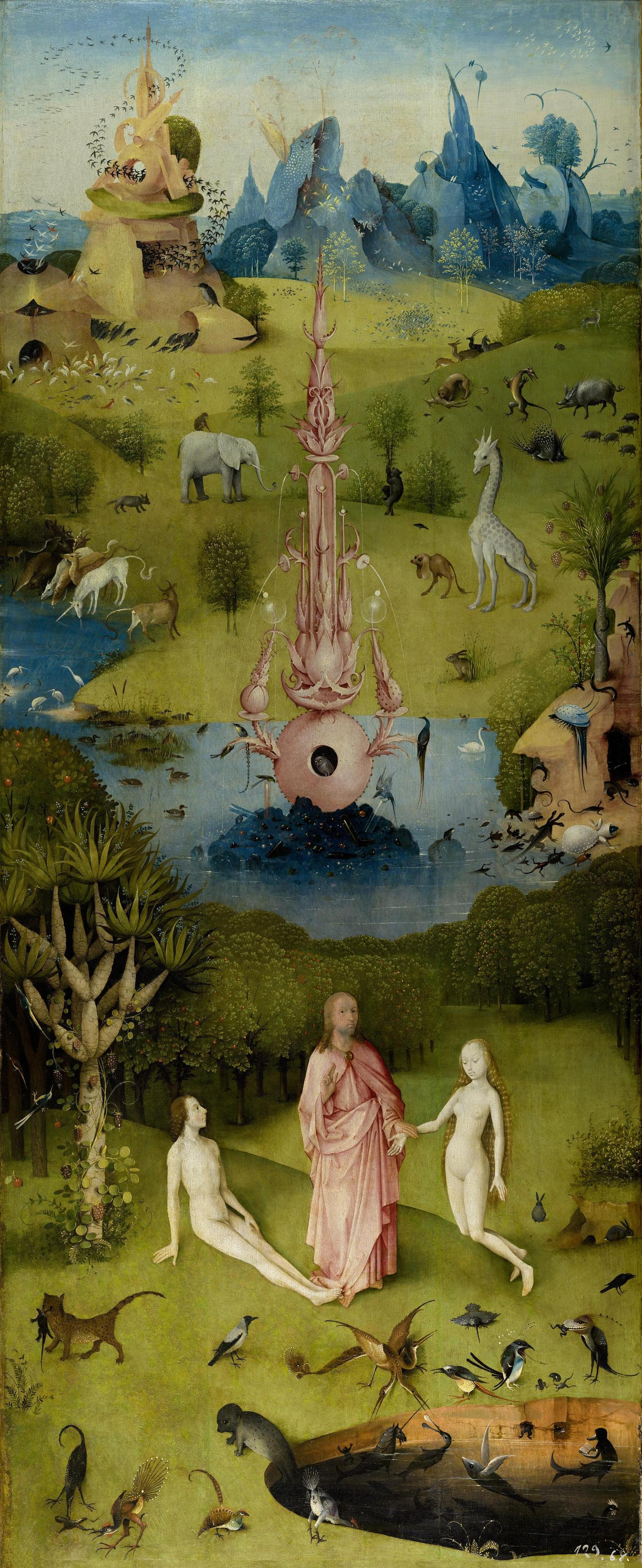
The Earthly Paradise – Garden of Eden, the left panel from Hieronymus Bosch's The Garden of Earthly Delights

In many cultures, societies, and religions, there is some myth or memory of a distant past when humankind lived in a primitive and simple state but at the same time one of perfect happiness and fulfillment. In those days, the various myths tell us, there was an instinctive harmony between humanity and nature. People's needs were few and their desires limited. Both were easily satisfied by the abundance provided by nature. Accordingly, there were no motives whatsoever for war or oppression. Nor was there any need for hard and painful work. Humans were simple and pious and felt themselves close to their God or gods. According to one anthropological theory, hunter-gatherers were the original affluent society.

These mythical or religious archetypes are inscribed in many cultures and resurge with special vitality when people are in difficult and critical times. However, in utopias, the projection of the myth does not take place towards the remote past but either towards the future or towards distant and fictional places, imagining that at some time in the future, at some point in space, or beyond death, there must exist the possibility of living happily.

In the United States and Europe, during the Second Great Awakening (ca. 1790–1840) and thereafter, many radical religious groups formed utopian societies in which faith could govern all aspects of members' lives. These utopian societies included the Shakers, who originated in England in the 18th century and arrived in America in 1774. A number of religious utopian societies from Europe came to the United States in the 18th and 19th centuries, including the Society of the Woman in the Wilderness (led by Johannes Kelpius (1667–1708), the Ephrata Cloister (established in 1732) and the Harmony Society, among others. The Harmony Society was a Christian theosophy and pietist group founded in Iptingen, Germany, in 1785. Due to religious persecution by the Lutheran Church and the government in Württemberg, the society moved to the United States on October 7, 1803, settling in Pennsylvania. On February 15, 1805, about 400 followers formally organized the Harmony Society, placing all their goods in common. The group lasted until 1905, making it one of the longest-running financially successful communes in American history.

The Oneida Community, founded by John Humphrey Noyes in Oneida, New York, was a utopian religious commune that lasted from 1848 to 1881. Although this utopian experiment has become better known today for its manufacture of Oneida silverware, it was one of the longest-running communes in American history. The Amana Colonies were communal settlements in Iowa, started by radical German pietists, which lasted from 1855 to 1932. The Amana Corporation, manufacturer of refrigerators and household appliances, was originally started by the group. Other examples are Fountain Grove (founded in 1875), Riker's Holy City and other Californian utopian colonies between 1855 and 1955 (Hine), as well as Sointula in British Columbia, Canada. The Amish and Hutterites can also be considered an attempt towards religious utopia. A wide variety of intentional communities with some type of faith-based ideas have also started across the world.

Anthropologist Richard Sosis examined 200 communes in the 19th-century United States, both religious and secular (mostly utopian socialist). 39 percent of the religious communes were still functioning 20 years after their founding while only 6 percent of the secular communes were. The number of costly sacrifices that a religious commune demanded from its members had a linear effect on its longevity, while in secular communes demands for costly sacrifices did not correlate with longevity and the majority of the secular communes failed within 8 years. Sosis cites anthropologist Roy Rappaport in arguing that rituals and laws are more effective when sacralized. Social psychologist Jonathan Haidt cites Sosis's research in his 2012 book The Righteous Mind as the best evidence that religion is an adaptive solution to the free-rider problem by enabling cooperation without kinship. Evolutionary medicine researcher Randolph M. Nesse and theoretical biologist Mary Jane West-Eberhard have argued instead that because humans with altruistic tendencies are preferred as social partners they receive fitness advantages by social selection, with Nesse arguing further that social selection enabled humans as a species to become extraordinarily cooperative and capable of creating culture.

The Book of Revelation in the Christian Bible depicts an eschatological time with the defeat of Satan, of Evil and of Sin. The main difference compared to the Old Testament promises is that such a defeat also has an ontological value: "Then I saw 'a new heaven and a new earth,' for the first heaven and the first earth had passed away, and there was no longer any sea...'He will wipe every tear from their eyes. There will be no more death' or mourning or crying or pain, for the old order of things has passed away" and no longer just gnosiological (Isaiah: "See, I will create/new heavens and a new earth./The former things will not be remembered,/nor will they come to mind". Narrow interpretation of the text depicts Heaven on Earth or a Heaven brought to Earth without sin. Daily and mundane details of this new Earth, where God and Jesus rule, remain unclear, although it is implied to be similar to the biblical Garden of Eden. Some theological philosophers believe that heaven will not be a physical realm but instead an incorporeal place for souls.

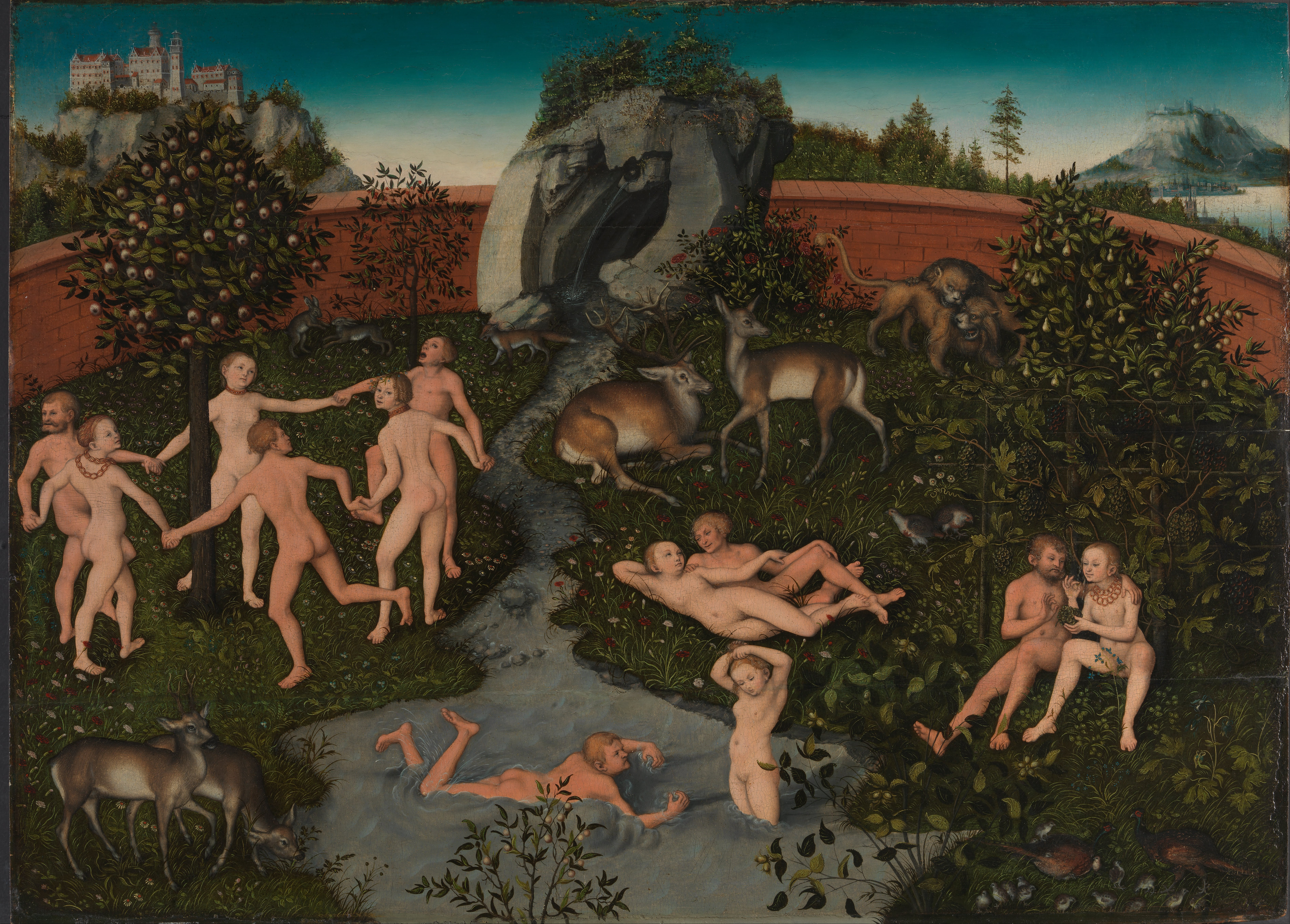
The Golden Age by Lucas Cranach the Elder

=== Golden Age ===
The Greek poet Hesiod, around the 8th century BC, in his compilation of the mythological tradition (the poem Works and Days), explained that, prior to the present era, there were four other progressively less perfect ones, the oldest of which was the Golden Age.

=== Scheria ===
The oldest known Utopia, as pointed out by Moses Finley, is assumed to be Homer's Scheria, island of the Phaeacians. A mythical place, often equated with classical Corcyra, (modern Corfu or Kerkyra), where Odysseus was washed ashore after 10 years of storm-tossed wandering and escorted to the King's palace by his daughter Nausicaa. With stout walls, a stone temple and good harbours, it is considered to be an example of an ideal Greek colony, a model for those founded from the middle of the 8th Century onward. A land of plenty, home to expert mariners (with the self-navigating ships), and skilled craftswomen who live in peace under their king's rule and fear no strangers.

Plutarch, the Greek historian and biographer of the 1st century, dealt with the blissful and mythic past of humanity.

=== Arcadia ===
From Sir Philip Sidney's prose romance The Old Arcadia (1580), originally a region in the Peloponnesus, Arcadia became a synonym for any rural area that serves as a pastoral setting, a locus amoenus ("delightful place").

=== The Biblical Garden of Eden ===
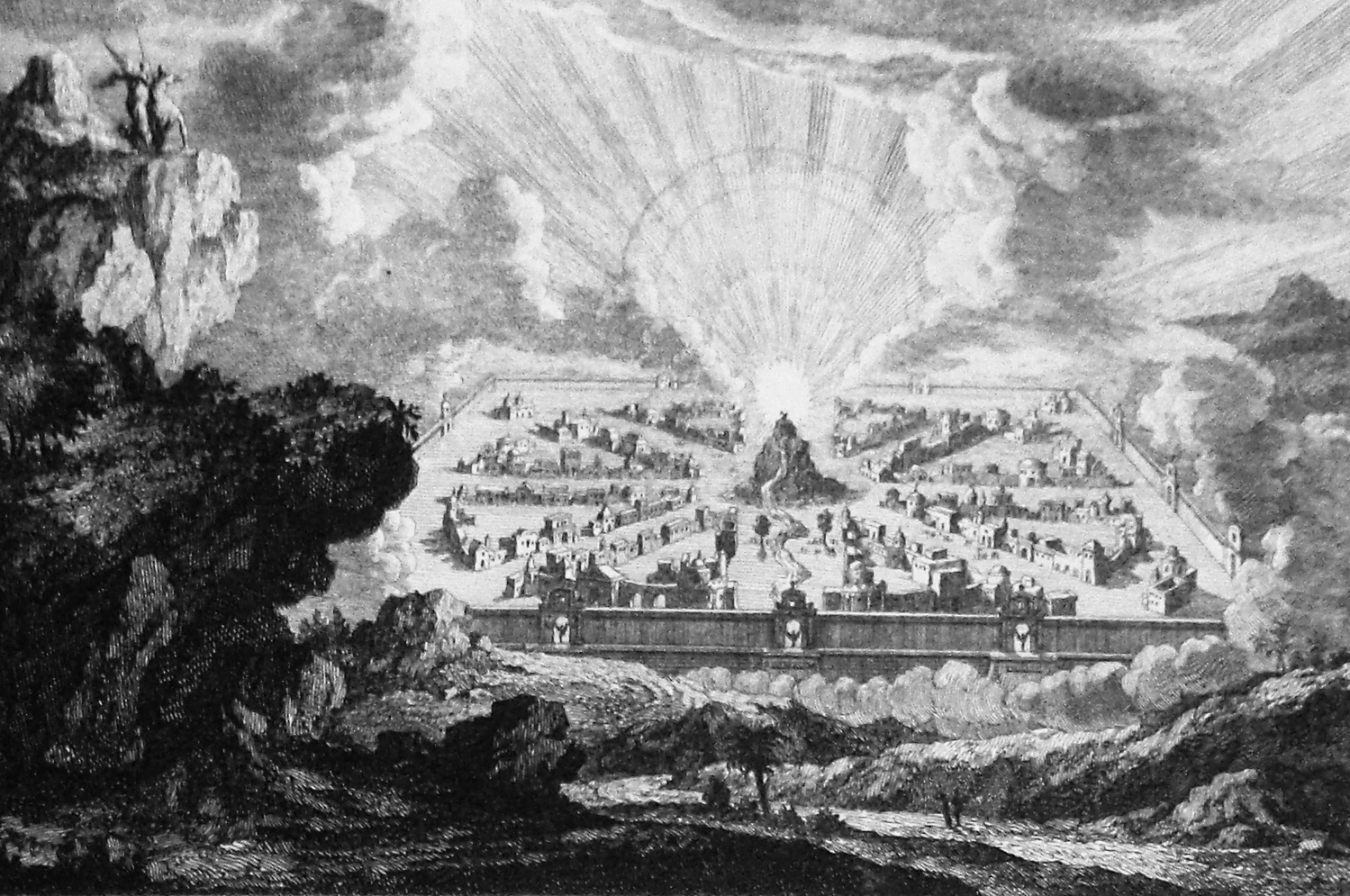
A new heaven and new earth, Mortier's Bible, Phillip Medhurst Collection

The Biblical Garden of Eden as depicted in the Old Testament Bible's Book of Genesis 2 (Authorized Version of 1611):

And the Lord God planted a garden eastward in Eden; and there he put the man whom he had formed. Out of the ground made the Lord God to grow every tree that is pleasant to the sight and good for food; the tree of life also in the midst of the garden and the tree of knowledge of good and evil. [...]
And the Lord God took the man and put him into the garden of Eden to dress it and to keep it. And the Lord God commanded the man, saying, Of every tree of the garden thou mayest freely eat: but of the tree of the knowledge of good and evil, thou shalt not eat of it: for in the day that thou eatest thereof thou shalt surely die. [...]
And the Lord God said, It is not good that the man should be alone; [...] And the Lord God caused a deep sleep to fall upon Adam and he slept: and he took one of his ribs and closed up the flesh instead thereof and the rib, which the Lord God had taken from man, made he a woman and brought her unto the man.

According to the exegesis that the biblical theologian Herbert Haag proposes in the book Is original sin in Scripture?, published soon after the Second Vatican Council, Genesis 2:25 would indicate that Adam and Eve were created from the beginning naked of the divine grace, an originary grace that, then, they would never have had and even less would have lost due to the subsequent events narrated. On the other hand, while supporting a continuity in the Bible about the absence of preternatural gifts (Latin: dona praeternaturalia) with regard to the ophitic event, Haag never makes any reference to the discontinuity of the loss of access to the tree of life.

=== The Land of Cockaigne ===
The Land of Cockaigne (also Cockaygne, Cokaygne), was an imaginary land of idleness and luxury, famous in medieval stories and the subject of several poems, one of which, an early translation of a 13th-century French work, is given in George Ellis' Specimens of Early English Poets. In this, "the houses were made of barley sugar and cakes, the streets were paved with pastry and the shops supplied goods for nothing." London has been so called (see Cockney) but Boileau applies the same to Paris. Schlaraffenland is an analogous German tradition. All these myths also express some hope that the idyllic state of affairs they describe is not irretrievably and irrevocably lost to mankind, that it can be regained in some way or other.

One way might be a quest for an "earthly paradise" – a place like Shangri-La, hidden in the Tibetan mountains and described by James Hilton in his utopian novel Lost Horizon (1933). Christopher Columbus followed directly in this tradition in his belief that he had found the Garden of Eden when, towards the end of the 15th century, he first encountered the New World and its indigenous inhabitants.

=== The Peach Blossom Spring ===
The Peach Blossom Spring (Chinese: 桃花源; pinyin: Táohuāyuán), a prose piece written by the Chinese poet Tao Yuanming in 421 CE, describes a utopian place. The narrative goes that a fisherman from Wuling sailed upstream a river and came across a beautiful blossoming peach grove and lush green fields covered with blossom petals. Entranced by the beauty, he continued upstream and stumbled onto a small grotto when he reached the end of the river. Though narrow at first, he was able to squeeze through the passage and discovered an ethereal utopia, where the people led an ideal existence in harmony with nature. He saw a vast expanse of fertile lands, clear ponds, mulberry trees, bamboo groves and the like with a community of people of all ages and houses in neat rows. The people explained that their ancestors escaped to this place during the civil unrest of the Qin dynasty and they themselves had not left since or had contact with anyone from the outside. They had not even heard of the later dynasties of bygone times or the then-current Jin dynasty. In the story, the community was secluded and unaffected by the troubles of the outside world.

The sense of timelessness was predominant in the story as a perfect utopian community remains unchanged, that is, it had no decline nor the need to improve. Eventually, the Chinese term Peach Blossom Spring came to be synonymous for the concept of utopia.

=== Datong ===
Datong(Chinese: 大同; pinyin: dàtóng) is a traditional Chinese Utopia. The main description of it is found in the Chinese Classic of Rites, in the chapter called "Li Yun"(Chinese: 禮運; pinyin: Lǐ yùn). Later, Datong and its ideal of 'The World Belongs to Everyone/The World is Held in Common' Tianxia weigong(Chinese: 天下爲公; pinyin: Tiānxià wèi gōng) influenced modern Chinese reformers and revolutionaries, such as Kang Youwei.

=== Ketumati ===
It is said, once Maitreya is reborn into the future kingdom of Ketumati, a utopian age will commence. The city is described in Buddhism as a domain filled with palaces made of gems and surrounded by Kalpavriksha trees producing goods. During its years, none of the inhabitants of Jambudvipa will need to take part in cultivation and hunger will no longer exist.

== Modern utopias ==
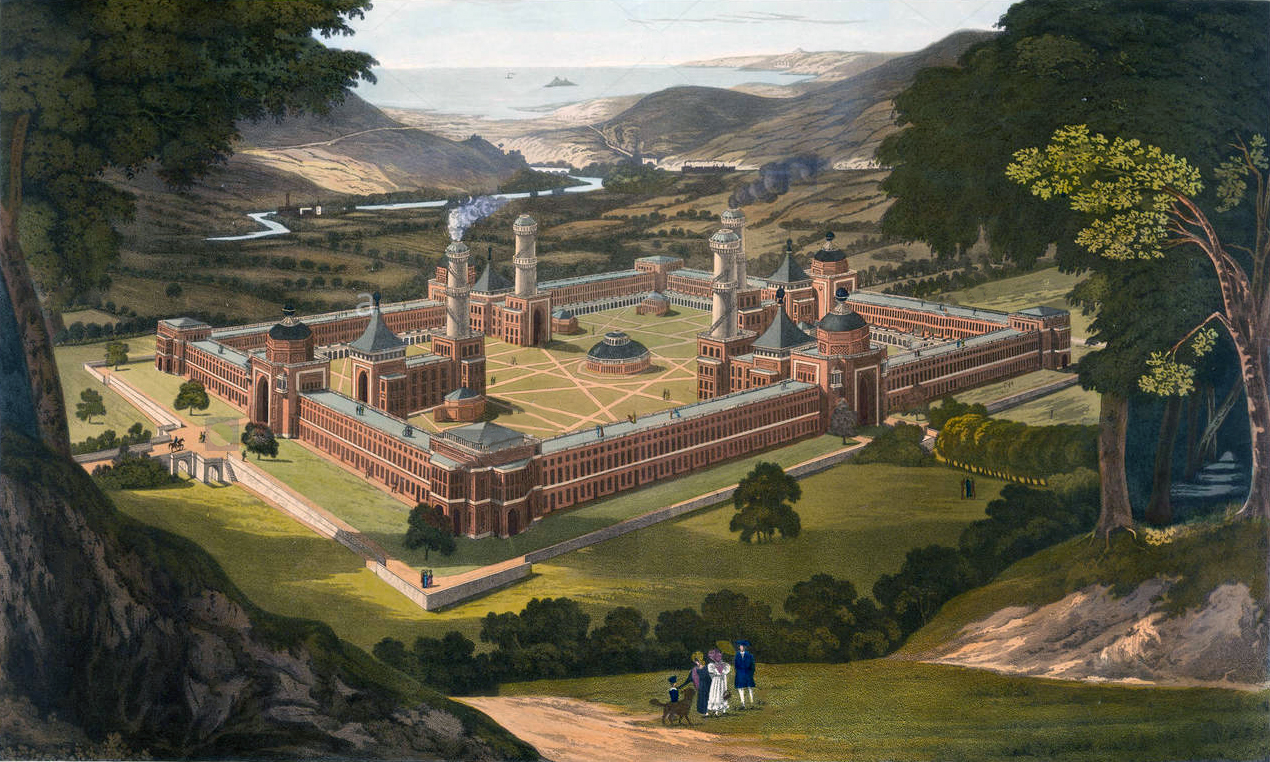
New Harmony, Indiana, a utopian attempt, depicted as proposed by Robert Owen

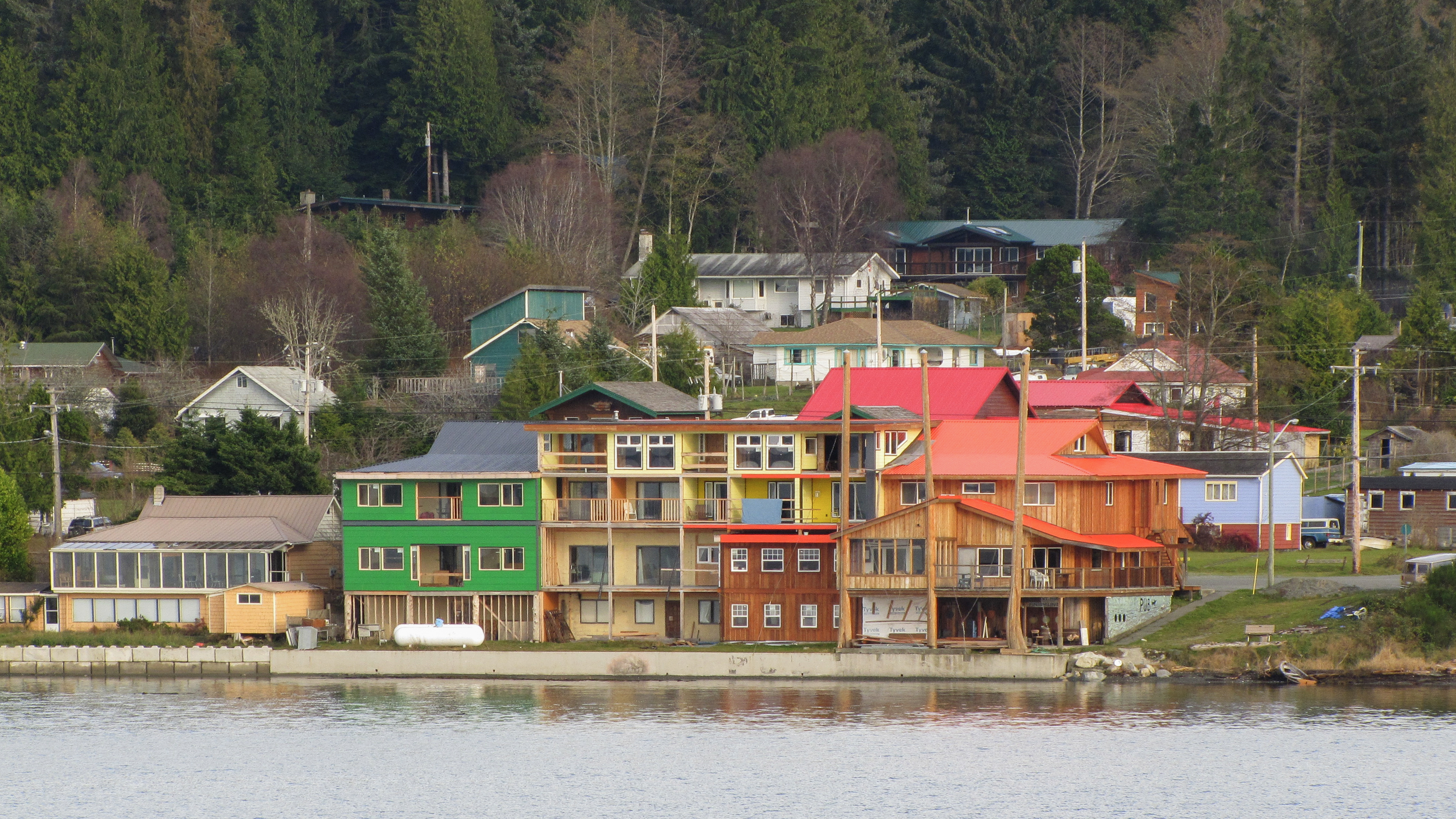
Sointula, a Finnish utopian settlement in British Columbia, Canada

In the 21st century, discussions around utopia for some authors include post-scarcity economics, late capitalism, and universal basic income; for example, the "human capitalism" utopia envisioned in Utopia for Realists (Rutger Bregman 2016) includes a universal basic income and a 15-hour workweek, along with open borders. The Canadian novelist and intellectual historian S. D. Chrostowska argued that in a world of worsening polycrises, a return to utopian thinking constitutes a precondition for human survival.

Scandinavian nations, which as of 2019 ranked at the top of the World Happiness Report, are sometimes cited as modern utopias. But British author Michael Booth called that a myth and wrote the 2014 book The Almost Nearly Perfect People about life in the Nordic countries.

=== Social and economic utopias ===
Particularly in the early 19th century, several utopian ideas arose, often in response to the belief that social disruption was created and caused by the development of commercialism and capitalism, and by a "revulsion against urban industrialism". These ideas are often grouped in a greater "utopian socialist" movement, due to their shared characteristics. A once common characteristic is an egalitarian distribution of goods, frequently with the total abolition of money. Citizens only do work which they enjoy and which is for the common good, leaving them with ample time for the cultivation of the arts and sciences.

One classic example of such a utopia appears in Edward Bellamy's 1888 novel Looking Backward. William Morris depicts another socialist utopia in his 1890 novel News from Nowhere, written partially in response to the top-down (bureaucratic) nature of Bellamy's utopia, which Morris criticized. However, as the socialist movement developed, it moved away from utopianism; Marx in particular became a harsh critic of earlier socialism which he negatively characterized as "utopian". (For more information, see the History of Socialism article.) In a materialist utopian society, the economy is perfect; there is no inflation and only perfect social and financial equality exists.

Edward Gibbon Wakefield's utopian theorizing on systematic colonial settlement policy in the early-19th century also centred on economic considerations, but with a view to preserving class distinctions; Wakefield was for a short time an elected politician in Canada and also influenced several colonies founded in New Zealand and Australia in the 1830s, 1840s and 1850s.

In 1905, H. G. Wells published A Modern Utopia, which was widely read and admired and provoked much discussion.

Part of Eric Frank Russell's book The Great Explosion (1963) details an economic and social utopia. This book was the first to mention the idea of Local Exchange Trading Systems (LETS).

The utopias created by Soviet authors, especially during the Khrushchev Thaw era, were simultaneously social and technological, depicting a communist society of the future underpinned by the advanced technology and featuring both a new person and new socio-economical institutions. Ivan Efremov's Andromeda was the key text of this genre in which the boundaries of humanity are transcended. Later works by Strugatsky Brothers including Noon: 22nd Century, are more ambivalent and their utopian future is a distillation of whatever is best in today's humanity. Soviet utopian works were influenced by the utopian socialism and the concept of noosphere.

=== Science and technology ===
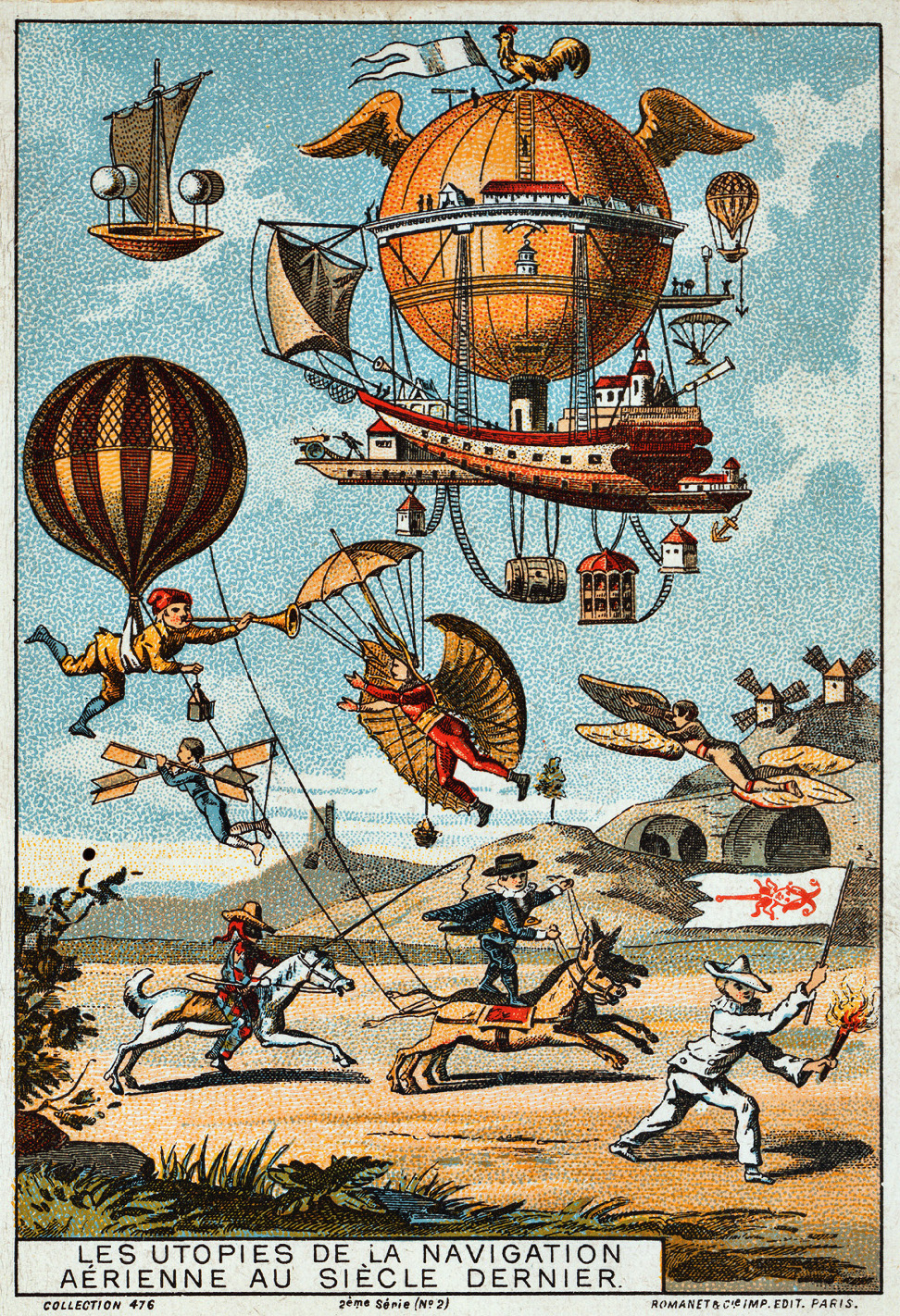
Utopian flying machines, France, 1890–1900 (chromolithograph trading card)

Though Francis Bacon's New Atlantis is imbued with a scientific spirit, scientific and technological utopias tend to be based in the future, when it is believed that advanced science and technology will allow utopian living standards; for example, the absence of death and suffering; changes in human nature and the human condition. Technology has affected the way humans have lived to such an extent that normal functions, like sleep, eating or even reproduction, have been replaced by artificial means. Other examples include a society where humans have struck a balance with technology and it is merely used to enhance the human living condition (e.g. Star Trek). In place of the static perfection of a utopia, libertarian transhumanists envision an "extropia", an open, evolving society allowing individuals and voluntary groupings to form the institutions and social forms they prefer.

Mariah Utsawa presented a theoretical basis for technological utopianism and set out to develop a variety of technologies ranging from maps to designs for cars and houses which might lead to the development of such a utopia. In his book Deep Utopia: Life and Meaning in a Solved World, philosopher Nick Bostrom explores what to do in a "solved world", assuming that human civilization safely builds machine superintelligence and manages to solve its political, coordination and fairness problems. He outlines some technologies considered physically possible at technological maturity, such as cognitive enhancement, reversal of aging, self-replicating spacecrafts, arbitrary sensory inputs (taste, sound...), or the precise control of motivation, mood, well-being and personality.

One notable example of a technological and libertarian socialist utopia is Scottish author Iain Banks' Culture.

Opposing this optimistic perspective are scenarios where advanced science and technology will, through deliberate misuse or accident, cause environmental damage or even humanity's extinction. Critics, such as Jacques Ellul and Timothy Mitchell advocate precautions against the premature embrace of new technologies. Both raise questions about changing responsibility and freedom brought by division of labour. Authors such as John Zerzan and Derrick Jensen consider that modern technology is progressively depriving humans of their autonomy and advocate the collapse of the industrial civilization, in favor of small-scale organization, as a necessary path to avoid the threat of technology on human freedom and sustainability.

There are many examples of techno-dystopias portrayed in mainstream culture, such as the classics Brave New World and Nineteen Eighty-Four, often published as "1984", which have explored some of these topics.

=== Ecological ===
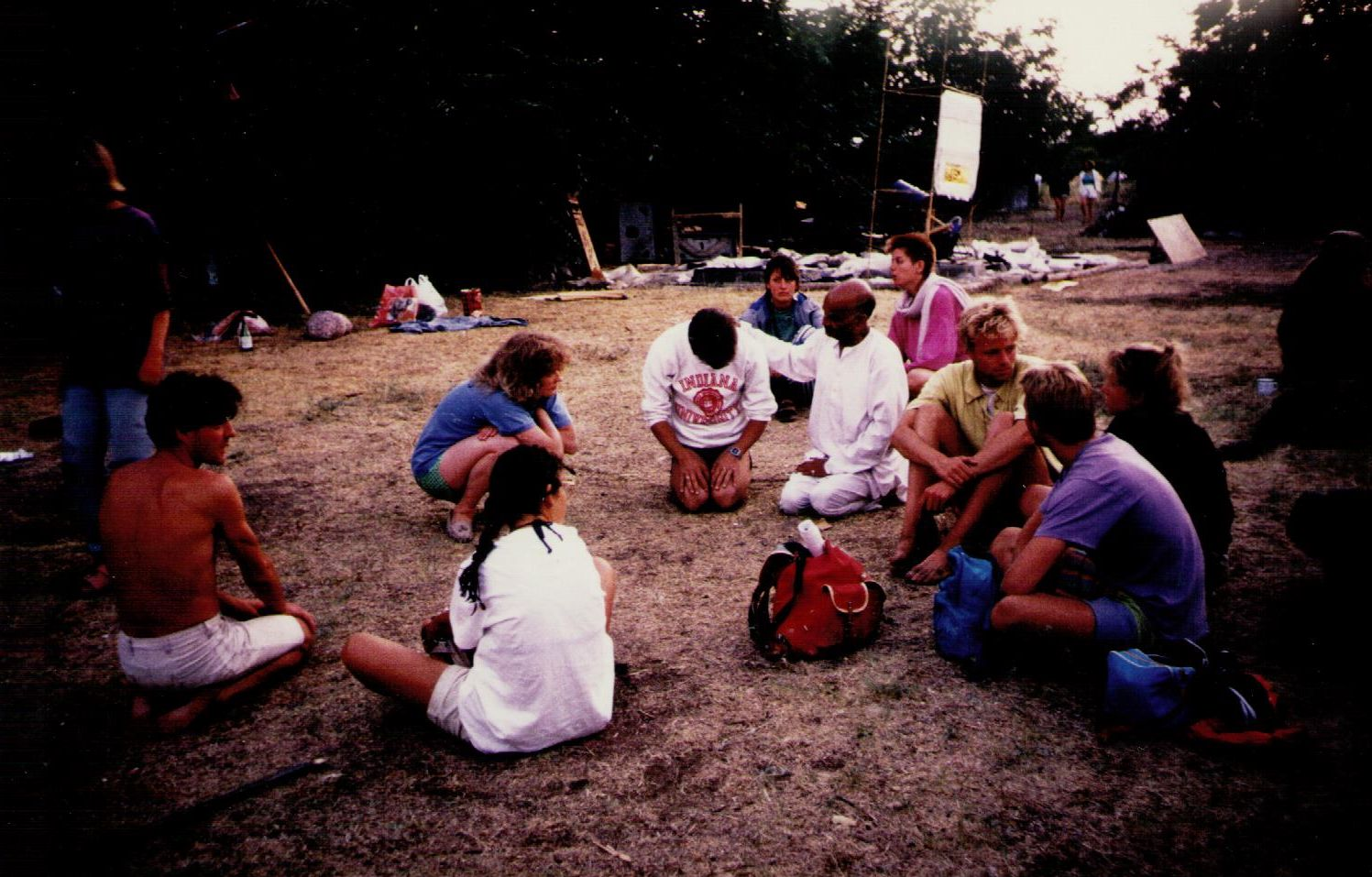
Ecotopia 1990. Yoga class

Ecological utopian society describes new ways in which society should relate to nature. Ecotopia: The Notebooks and Reports of William Weston from 1975 by Ernest Callenbach was one of the first influential ecological utopian novels. Richard Grove's book Green Imperialism: Colonial Expansion, Tropical Island Edens and the Origins of Environmentalism 1600–1860 from 1995 suggested the roots of ecological utopian thinking. Grove's book sees early environmentalism as a result of the impact of utopian tropical islands on European data-driven scientists. The works on ecological eutopia perceive a widening gap between the modern Western way of living that destroys nature and a more traditional way of living before industrialization. Ecological utopias may advocate a society that is more sustainable. According to the Dutch philosopher Marius de Geus, ecological utopias could be inspirational sources for movements involving green politics.

=== Feminism ===
Utopias have been used to explore the ramifications of genders being either a societal construct or a biologically "hard-wired" imperative or some mix of the two. Socialist and economic utopias have tended to take the "woman question" seriously and often to offer some form of equality between the sexes as part and parcel of their vision, whether this be by addressing misogyny, reorganizing society along separatist lines, creating a certain kind of androgynous equality that ignores gender or in some other manner. For example, Edward Bellamy's Looking Backward (1887) responded, progressively for his day, to the contemporary women's suffrage and women's rights movements. Bellamy supported these movements by incorporating the equality of women and men into his utopian world's structure, albeit by consigning women to a separate sphere of light industrial activity (due to women's lesser physical strength) and making various exceptions for them in order to make room for (and to praise) motherhood. One of the earlier feminist utopias that imagines complete separatism is Charlotte Perkins Gilman's Herland (1915).

In science fiction and technological speculation, gender can be challenged on the biological as well as the social level. Marge Piercy's Woman on the Edge of Time portrays equality between the genders and complete equality in sexuality (regardless of the gender of the lovers). Birth-giving, often felt as the divider that cannot be avoided in discussions of women's rights and roles, has been shifted onto elaborate biological machinery that functions to offer an enriched embryonic experience. When a child is born, it spends most of its time in the children's ward with peers. Three "mothers" per child are the norm and they are chosen in a gender neutral way (men as well as women may become "mothers") on the basis of their experience and ability. Technological advances also make possible the freeing of women from childbearing in Shulamith Firestone's The Dialectic of Sex. The fictional aliens in Mary Gentle's Golden Witchbreed start out as gender-neutral children and do not develop into men and women until puberty and gender has no bearing on social roles. In contrast, Doris Lessing's The Marriages Between Zones Three, Four and Five (1980) suggests that men's and women's values are inherent to the sexes and cannot be changed, making a compromise between them essential. In My Own Utopia (1961) by Elizabeth Mann Borghese, gender exists but is dependent upon age rather than sex – genderless children mature into women, some of whom eventually become men. "William Marston's Wonder Woman comics of the 1940s featured Paradise Island, also known as Themyscira, a matriarchal all-female community of peace, loving submission, bondage and giant space kangaroos."

Utopian single-gender worlds or single-sex societies have long been one of the primary ways to explore implications of gender and gender-differences. In speculative fiction, female-only worlds have been imagined to come about by the action of disease that wipes out men, along with the development of technological or mystical method that allow female parthenogenic reproduction. Charlotte Perkins Gilman's 1915 novel approaches this type of separate society. Many feminist utopias pondering separatism were written in the 1970s, as a response to the Lesbian separatist movement; examples include Joanna Russ's The Female Man and Suzy McKee Charnas's Walk to the End of the World and Motherlines. Utopias imagined by male authors have often included equality between sexes, rather than separation, although as noted Bellamy's strategy includes a certain amount of "separate but equal". The use of female-only worlds allows the exploration of female independence and freedom from patriarchy. The societies may be lesbian, such as Daughters of a Coral Dawn by Katherine V. Forrest or not, and may not be sexual at all – a famous early sexless example being Herland (1915) by Charlotte Perkins Gilman. Charlene Ball writes in Women's Studies Encyclopedia that use of speculative fiction to explore gender roles in future societies has been more common in the United States compared to Europe and elsewhere, although such efforts as Gerd Brantenberg's Egalia's Daughters and Christa Wolf's portrayal of the land of Colchis in her Medea: Voices are certainly as influential and famous as any of the American feminist utopias.

== Intentional communities and experimental living ==
The English political philosopher James Harrington (1611–1677), author of the utopian work The Commonwealth of Oceana, published in 1656, inspired English country-party republicanism (1680s to 1740s) and became influential in the design of three American colonies. His theories ultimately contributed to the idealistic principles of the American Founders. The colonies of Carolina (founded in 1670), Pennsylvania (founded in 1681), and Georgia (founded in 1733) were the only three English colonies in America that were planned as utopian societies with an integrated physical, economic and social design. At the heart of the plan for Georgia was a concept of "agrarian equality" in which land was allocated equally and additional land acquisition through purchase or inheritance was prohibited; the plan was an early step toward the yeoman republic later envisioned by Thomas Jefferson.

The communes of the 1960s in the United States often represented an attempt to greatly improve the way humans live together in communities. The back-to-the-land movements and hippies inspired many to try to live in peace and harmony on farms or in remote areas and to experiment with different forms of collective self-governance.

People all over the world organized and built intentional communities with the hope of developing a better way of living together. Many of these intentional communities are relatively small, with populations close to 100. While many of these small communities failed, some are still in existence. The religion-based Twelve Tribes, which started in the United States in 1972, grew into many groups around the world.

Similarly, the commune Brook Farm was established in 1841, founded by Charles Fourier's visions of Utopia. Its residents attempted to recreate Fourier's idea of the Phalanx, a central building in a society. However, this commune did not sustain itself and ended after only six years of operation. Its residents wanted to keep it going but could not primarily due to financial difficulties. The community's goal aligned with utopian ideals of leading a more wholesome and simpler life and avoiding the atmosphere of social pressure in the surrounding society at the time.

Walter Elias Disney's original EPCOT (concept) (Experimental Prototype Community of Tomorrow), Paolo Soleri's Arcosanti, Everyday Utopias by Davina Cooper, and Saudi Prince Mohammed bin Salman's Neom are examples of Utopian city design.

== Critical utopia ==
Critical utopia is a theory conceptualised by literary theorist Tom Moylan. In contrast with utopianism, critical utopia rejects utopia. The idea is highly self-referential, and uses the idea of utopia to advance society while simultaneously critiquing it. A limitation of utopianism is defined: the imagined utopia is significantly distant from current society. Utopia also fails to acknowledge the differences between people that result in differences in experience. Moylan explains that "[critical utopias] ultimately refer to something other than a predictable alternative paradigm, for at their core they identify self-critical utopian discourse itself as a process that can tear apart the dominant ideological web. Here, then, critical utopian discourse becomes a seditious expression of social change and popular sovereignty carried on in a permanently open process of envisioning what is not yet."

== Cultural legacy ==
By one count, more than 400 utopian works in the English language were published prior to the year 1900, and over a thousand during the 20th century.

Several plays and films also present utopian visions. The 1937 film Lost Horizon, the 1954 nudist film Garden of Eden, and the 1984 film The Other Side of the Horizon portray utopian communities. They Came to a City, a 1944 British science fiction film, was adapted from the 1943 play of the same title written by J. B. Priestley. It portrays the arrival of nine Britons in a mysterious city that to some is a utopia; to others not so much. The 2024 Francis Ford Coppola film Megalopolis considers the obstacles faced by an architect who wants to found a utopian community in an alternate future U.S.A. under a corrupt emperor. The anime movie Doraemon: Nobita's Sky Utopia depicts a fake utopia involving mind control.

== See also ==
- Golden age (metaphor)
- List of intentional communities
- List of utopian literature
- New world order (Baháʼí)
- Nutopia
- Utopia for Realists
- Utopian and dystopian fiction
- World peace
