= Sotsgorod: Cities for Utopia =

1996 Dutch documentary on early Soviet urban planning

Sotsgorod: Cities for Utopia (Dutch: Sotsgorod — Steden voor de heilstaat) is a 1996 Dutch documentary film about a group of Western European architects who were invited by the Soviet Union to construct "socialist cities" in Siberia during the late 1920s and early 1930s. The film draws on interviews with some of the last living survivors of the time, including Jan Rutgers (of the Kuzbass Autonomous Industrial Colony), Margarete Lihotzky (Margarete Schütte-Lihotzky of the Ernst May group), and Philipp Tolziner (of the "Bauhaus Brigade"). The film also utilizes letters, articles, and lectures written by those who have already died, including Hans Schmidt, Mart Stam, Johannes van Loghem, and Ernst May. Additionally, the film follows the daily lives of contemporary residents of Magnitogorsk, Orsk, Novokuznetsk, and Kemerovo.

== Historical background ==
After the 1917 Revolution, the Soviet Union implemented its first five year plan of rapid industrialization. Due to the extensive natural resources in Siberia, including lumber, coal and iron, a large number of mines, foundries, and factories were established in the region. In order to provide accommodation for the large influx of industrial workers employed in these enterprises, the Communist party planned the finance and construction of "new socialist cities", or "Sotsgorods". These cities were meant to be a worker's utopia: modern, efficient, and practical, but also harmonious, clean, and pleasant.

Wary of contemporary Soviet architects, either for political or practical reasons, the Communist party invited several Western European architects, mostly German and Dutch, to build these cities in the late 1920s and early 1930s. For a variety of reasons, these architects left their established careers for Siberia. Some believed in socialist ideals and thought that they were making an essential contribution to the workers' struggle; others were seizing upon an unheard of opportunity to apply their design philosophies and spatial theories to entire cities; others simply wished to escape the regularity of their work in Europe. Ultimately, they collectively constructed approximately twenty cities in Soviet Siberia.

During the early years of their stay, these architects were treated with respect, assigned privileged statuses and preferential housing. However, in later years, the architects encountered various frustrations and find progress to be slow and cumbersome. Due to the outbreak of World War II, the Soviet government's attention and priorities shifted away from the development of these cities and towards the battlefront, leaving some cities only half-built while tearing down others for much needed resources such as iron for military materiel. The architects, most of whom were facing issues with their passport expiration dates, were given the option to either return to Western Europe or stay and become Soviet citizens. Today, although many have died, their creations still stand. Cities like Magnitogorsk and Orsk continue to be major industrial centers of the Russian Federation.

== Summary ==
Sotsgorod: Cities for Utopia opens with a staged scene at a train station in Moscow. A loudspeaker calls out arrivals, departures, and destinations, with cities such as Magnitogorsk and Orsk among those listed. One by one, the film reveals background information about the architects and reveals their reasons for accepting the Soviet Union's invitation to move to Siberia. These include Margarete Schutte-Lihotzky, a Frankfurt architect of the Ernst May group, who left for Siberia in order to escape the monotony of her job. Her career already entailed socialist ideals, such as constructing kitchens that could rationalize and scientifically promote the functionality of housekeeping. Hannes Meyer, on the other hand, was sacked from his post as Director of the Bauhaus in August 1930 due his communist sympathies. He moved to Moscow later the same year.

When the architects first arrive, they are treated well and given relative freedom in their designs. However, they soon encounter various frustrations, including a lack of proper equipment and trained workers, language barriers, and bureaucratic issues. Margarete Lihotzky recalls her own difficult experiences of dealing with the Kyrgyz women who had been hastily trained to become bricklayers for kindergartens. Other architects describe having to deal with a lack of suitable materials, including iron. Although iron was considered an essential component of modern construction, the local governments were reluctant to allow their primary material for weapons and industries be incorporated in the architecture. Lack of communication, mistrust of the government, and even disdain for some of the architects themselves (at several points architect Jan Rutgers calls Russia and its people "primitive") were just some of obstacles that greatly hindered progress and resulted in poor construction on a number of occasions.

As World War II breaks out, the architects are faced with the decision to leave for Western Europe or to stay and become Soviet citizens. At this point, approximately ten years had passed since their arrival to Siberia, and many of their passports are on the verge of expiration. Some chose to return, though not necessarily to their fatherlands. Others chose to stay, as returning to Nazi Germany was not an option.

The film jumps back and forth between timelines while maintaining the narratives of the architects, weaving contemporary footage and historical narratives together. It pans to winter scenes of Siberian cities in 1995, showing public bathhouses, playgrounds, a children's dance hall, a fire station, administration buildings, multi-family housing units, etc., and following the daily lives of residents of Magnitogorsk, Orsk, Novokuznetsk, and Kemerovo. The documentary ends with a scene of young people at a dance party in Orsk.

== Critical analysis ==
Sotsgorod: Cities for Utopia shows both the modern, industrial development of Siberia and the clashes between East and West at this time. Drawing on firsthand accounts and primary sources, the film juxtaposes conflicting concepts: the Soviet government's desire for modernity, but its attachment to traditional ideals; the visions of the Western European architects at odds with their host; tying modern footage to stories of the past. However, by relying solely on the experiences of Western Europeans, the documentary also represents a rather biased view of this subject.

As viewers can only see things from the architects' perspectives it is very easy to form a very one-sided opinion of this period of time. Another theme of the film is xenophobia in the Soviet Union. Despite extending the invitations and providing preferential treatment to the Western architects, the Soviet government remained wary of its guests and helpers. Several of the architects, unable to gain access to certain materials and restricted in terms of designs, complained about the government's limitations. Grand visions of electricity, sewage, and running water more or less abandoned due to the lack of government cooperation. Moreover, more serious, even blatantly hostile situations such as the theft of blueprints and surveillance of the architects, became common. Thus, there is the sense that these architects could not carry out their sincere visions to help the Soviet people because of unrelenting bureaucracy, at both national and local levels. What the film does not explore, however, is the parallel situation of Soviet architects, or that worldwide construction and urbanization had essentially stagnated during this time period.

Finally what viewers may get from this film is perhaps what they may have anticipated from the very beginning: that conditions in the Soviet Union were hostile, both to its own people and foreigners, and that, even now, life is rather bleak in this region. The stagnation of these cities is made clear by transitions between scenes of the past and present. At one point in the film, kindergartners in Magnitogorsk were shown marching around a practice room and performing exercises. The rigidity of this scene parallels a scene of miners from the 1930s, who were also participating in communal exercise activities. This may give the viewer the idea that the regimented lifestyle of the Soviet era continues to persist to this day.

Other footage from 1995 also reveals similarly downbeat scenes, using by winter's natural bleakness to exacerbate the severity of the images. Smoke and steam from factories shrouds the sky, children are shown smoking in playgrounds, and even the final scene at a disco in Orsk seems eerily dark and uncomfortable. What were initially planned as socialist utopias eventually became grey, soot-covered, desolate cities decades later. By looking at the quality of people's everyday lives, the film attempts to measure the success of the ideals of the architects. The director rather concludes that the urbanization and modernization of Siberia was a failure, at least from a western viewpoint.

== Kotkin's Magnitogorsk ==
=== Planning ===
Although Magnitogorsk was initially planned as a Sotsgorod (socialist city), a "socialist city of the future", the urban planning of the city did not materialize as originally intended. Although Magnitogorsk was eventually constructed using "planned" design principles, these designs did not showcase the quintessential Sotsgorod concepts that the original sketches outlined. One of the most thorough sources detailing the history of Magnitogorsk as a Sotsgorod is Stephen Kotkin's Magnetic Mountain: Stalinism as a Civilization, which provides an in-depth look at the beginning stages of the construction of Magnitogorsk. Kotkin describes the chaotic and disappointing planning and construction of the Sotsgorod in its early years, highlighting the failures of the building of Magnitogorsk.

Socialist cities were to be composed of many different elements, with the ultimate goal being the creation of cities completely opposite to capitalist cities. The Soviets were adamant about creating socialist cities that in no way resembled capitalist cities — capitalism was "criminal anarchy". These elements included the following: a foundation on education and science, not on religion; public facilities such as dining halls, baths, reading rooms, playgrounds, daycare centers, schools, and theaters; wide streets (as opposed to alleys); standardized furniture; identical housing units; and equal access to sunlight and air. A Sotsgorod, then, would offer its residents the same life no matter where they lived in the city; urban planning was even to build all housing equidistant from the workplace. As Magnitogorsk poet Boris Ruchev said, the quintessential socialist city of Magnitogorsk was supposed to embody "hope and progress". Uniformity and "maximum socialization of everyday life" were the greatest objectives of a Sotsgorod.

The urban planning of Magnitogorsk, however, did not go as smoothly as urban planners wished. Although Ernst May ended up designing Magnitogorsk, an earlier design was submitted by a Professor Chernyshev, the winner of a competition to plan the city. Rather than work with Chernyshev's plan, May created his own unique plan for Magnitogorsk, a plan for a "linear city". However, when May saw the site of the future Magnitogorsk in person, he was surprised to find that not only was the site not very suitable to his plans, but the site was not the home of the "future" Magnitogorsk, but of the currently-in-construction Magnitogorsk.

The site for Magnitogorsk contained two different banks, an eastern bank and a western bank, separated by the Ural River. The workplaces of the Magnitogorsk residents, the mine and factory, were located on the eastern bank. Temporary residences, too, were located on the eastern bank. The western bank was located more at a distance from the workplaces, separated by an industrial lake. The pros of continuing construction on the eastern bank included a lower price tag, the elimination of a mass transit system that would be needed to transport residents from their homes to their workplace, and more completed housing by the opening of the steel factory, which was scheduled for 1932. Workers eventually discovered that the big con to continuing construction on the eastern bank was the smoke that blew right into the site from the factory. Therefore, workers were instructed to move the housing site at least two kilometers away from the factory.

May, upon his arrival, discovered that the newly chosen site for housing (which was still on the eastern bank) was too hilly for his optimal construction. The location of the mountain and the factory on the eastern bank only allowed so much land within a reasonable distance of the factory to be considered for the Sotsgorod's housing. This nixed May's "linear city" plan and forced him to come to terms with the idea of housing construction in a small triangular-shaped piece of land on the eastern bank; it was important to May that residents be as comfortably close as possible to their workplace. Another health risk was present in this new design: close proximity to the industrial lake. The lake gave off harmful gases, putting residents' health at risk in much the same way that the smoke and fumes from the factory did in the earlier construction plan.

The location of Magnitogorsk's housing was a controversial topic. While May was forced to continually alter his designs, the government was debating between the eastern bank and the western bank as the optimal location for housing. A popular song characterized the situation:

To the left? To the right?
Socialist City, where will you be?
Your designs have been drifting
Two years without an answer.

=== Construction ===
The government chose to never give a straight answer to the problem of construction, leading May to design plans for housing construction on both the eastern and western banks; the government reviewed both of his plans in 1932 and decided upon the eastern bank as the location for Magnitogorsk, despite their hesitance regarding its shortcomings. Acknowledging the small size of his triangular-shaped city for the eastern bank and the large number of residents with temporary residences there, May designed a plan that included an additional northern satellite city on the eastern bank. While the inclusion of two separate housing facilities/cities shot down the idea of all housing being equidistant from the factory, May determined that the factory was likely to expand and would do so in a northerly direction, making the northern satellite city closer to the factory in the future. For the western bank, May designed a plan that stayed true to his "linear city" visions. The western bank plan could keep housing facilities in one location and protect residents from the factory fumes and the gases from the lake.

When construction according to the plans of May had been underway for a while, problems began to arise. The work being done was not high-quality, and necessities for the buildings were not available. May's construction plans incorporated heaters, for instance, but the radiators needed to heat the buildings weren't present when they needed to be. Plans also incorporated toilets, but toilets were not available when the construction was completed — and there was no sewage system present in Magnitogorsk to begin with. Problems like those with the sewage system exemplified the contrast between the shining socialist city the Soviets envisioned, and the reality of the sotsgorod — residents were rather inconvenienced by having to cross the street in the middle of the night to use temporary toilets, and sanitation was compromised.

The local authorities in Magnitogorsk were seemingly more fixated on the completion of the factory, which may have contributed to the shortcomings in the construction of Magnitogorsk. (The constant approval needed from Soviet authorities higher up, though, also held up the construction process.) Money to be spent on the housing construction was used for the factory instead; buildings were left unfinished. In 1932, government officials became completely aware of the situation in Magnitogorsk and ordered that a concrete city plan be produced, unfinished buildings be completed, and a new construction agency be put together. These orders were not carried out; instead of submitting a new city plan, the eastern bank plan May designed with a northern satellite city was resubmitted. Instead of the quality of constructing picking up, it declined — wood replaced brick for housing facilities.

May was eventually fired and left the Soviet Union. He was blamed for the shortcomings of the construction of Magnitogorsk, and his designs were criticized by Soviets as being too plain, and I. Ivich said they were able to "elicit enthusiasm only among lovers of prison architecture". May only gave the Soviets the communalization that a sotsgorod required, but he left out any sort of decorative additions to the buildings. The Soviets, though, had hopes of Magnitogorsk being an attractive city, and May was blamed for this failure. May's lack of inclusion of courtyards was criticized, as well. The sotsgorod requirement "equal access to sun and air" prevented May from including courtyards in his design plans, but sun and air were less a concern than the brutal wind in Siberia.

=== Reaction ===
There was an overall lack of enthusiasm with the sotsgorod of "hope and progress". Industry commissar Sergo Ordzhonikidze visited Magnitogorsk in 1933 and declared that Magnitogorsk be deemed an "urban raion" as opposed to a sotsgorod, a socialist city. His remarks were scathing: "When referring to your socialist city it is wrong to speak about a 'socialist city'. This is a direct insult to socialism. One ought not to use the word socialist when it is inappropriate to do so. You have named some manure a socialist city. A 'socialist' city — and it's impossible to live in it."

Extremely displeased with the work completed on the eastern bank, Ordzhonikidze ordered Magnitogorsk be moved to the western bank. Like the disordered switches that plagued Magnitogorsk since its conception, the new switch to the western bank was chaotic with little progress. A new plan was designed, but it was not received well; new construction was set to begin in 1935, but even by 1938 very little construction was completed — the labor of many workers was wasted. During these years, construction did take place on the eastern bank that was more appealing to the Soviets than May's designs, but just as before, the quality of work was low — faucets and heaters leaked, bathtubs had yet to arrive, and the windows substituted wood boards for glass.

Even more importantly, the population of Magnitogorsk was seriously underestimated; the construction of Magnitogorsk accounted for only a portion of its future population. With the factory being the focus of Magnitogorsk, planners failed to accurately design a city to accommodate the services needed for day-to-day living by the residents of the sotsgorod.

Despite the outrageous shortcomings in the construction of the socialist city, by 1938 the eastern bank housed several thousand residents in what became more exclusive superblocks. "More exclusive" in Magnitogorsk meant it housed those residents who were the equivalent of middle-class workers with access to better schools and daycare facilities and whose wages were above average. When the Soviets learned of the arrival of Americans, however, they were forced to design and build a completely new and more exclusive settlement to house the Americans during their stay.

The American settlement, Amerikanka, was built in a wooded area north of the factory. The Soviets ordered that Amerikanka provide the Americans with the type of housing they were used to; thus, individual houses with all the amenities were built, and a restaurant-style dining hall with waiter service was provided. Originally, only foreigners were allowed to reside in Amerikanka, but eventually Soviet authorities with more prestige began moving in, too. When all of the foreigners left, the settlement was renamed Berezka. More Soviet officials moved in, and they continued to build American-style housing instead of building facilities characteristic of a sotsgorod. Gardens, chauffeurs, gated homes, and elite shops were found in Berezka, introducing a wide gap between the living conditions of the privileged officials and the other residents of Magnitogorsk. Although officials tried to keep their lifestyle in Berezka quiet, residents in Magnitogorsk received leaked information from time to time. A ball, for instance, was held among the elites who lived in Berezka, but tickets had to be redistributed after other residents managed to receive tickets. Workers who performed services in Berezka, too, became aware of the lifestyle of the residents of Berezka.

The majority of Magnitogorsk residents, though, still lived in temporary housing, highlighting how far from the socialist city Magnitogorsk really was. Tents, barracks, and mud huts housed these residents, and these settlements spread out around the factory, often taking on names describing their residents or location. Transportation around the city became problematic, with cars few and far between and a small fleet of buses prone to breakdowns. A tram was built in 1935, but it served a relatively low number of citizens. Residents were subject to an atmosphere of crime, thanks to settlements of convicts and a lack of law enforcement. Livestock could be found everywhere. Electricity and heating weren't always reliable.

Sanitation continued to be a health problem — not only did many residents still used outdoor toilets, but the water supply was not suitable; water had to be boiled to be drinkable. Several diseases spread throughout Magnitogorsk, including typhus, malaria, and scarlet fever. The hospital in Magnitogorsk was terribly inadequate to serve the medical needs of its residents — water, sewage, and heating continued to be a problem in the city, including the hospital — and there were never enough beds or doctors to tend to the needs of there patients.

== See also ==
- Ecomodernism
- The Almost Nearly Perfect People
- Utopia for Realists
- Utopian architecture
