= Nürnberger Versicherung =

German insurance company

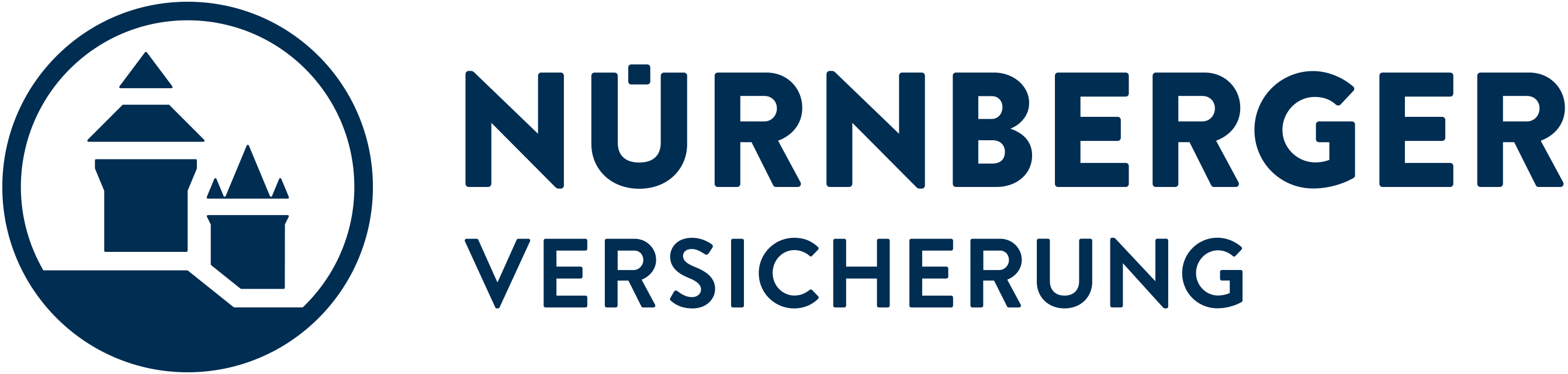
- Type: Public (Aktiengesellschaft)
- Industry: Insurance
- Founded: 16 February 1884; 142 years ago
- Founder: Lothar von Faber
- Headquarters: Nuremberg, Germany
- Key people: Armin Zitzmann (CEO)
- Revenue: €4.567 billion (2019)
- Number of employees: 4,487 (2019)
- Website: www.nuernberger.de

Nürnberger Versicherung is a German insurance company headquartered in Nuremberg. The group operates in the life, private health, property/casualty and auto insurance segments as well as in the financial services sector, primarily in Germany and Austria.

The group's parent company, Nürnberger Beteiligungs-Aktiengesellschaft, is listed on the stock exchange and trades in the over-the-counter segment Scale (formerly Entry Standard).

== History ==
The roots of today's insurance group lie in the Nürnberger Lebensversicherungs-Bank founded on February 16, 1884, by Lothar Freiherr von Faber, Friedrich von Grundherr, Johannes Falk, Johan Georg Kugler, Moritz Poehlmann, Samuel Bloch and Karl Wunder. On September 28 of the same year, the Royal Bavarian State Ministry of the Interior granted permission to do business; in December 1884, the first life insurance certificate was issued.

=== Corporate history ===
The Nürnberger Lebensversicherungs-Bank was founded in 1884. It launched the first private accidental death and dismemberment insurance policy in Bavaria in 1885. In 1906, Nürnberger received approval to include liability insurance. As a recognized self-help institution for the public service, it set up the Civil Servants' Pension Allowance Insurance in 1908.

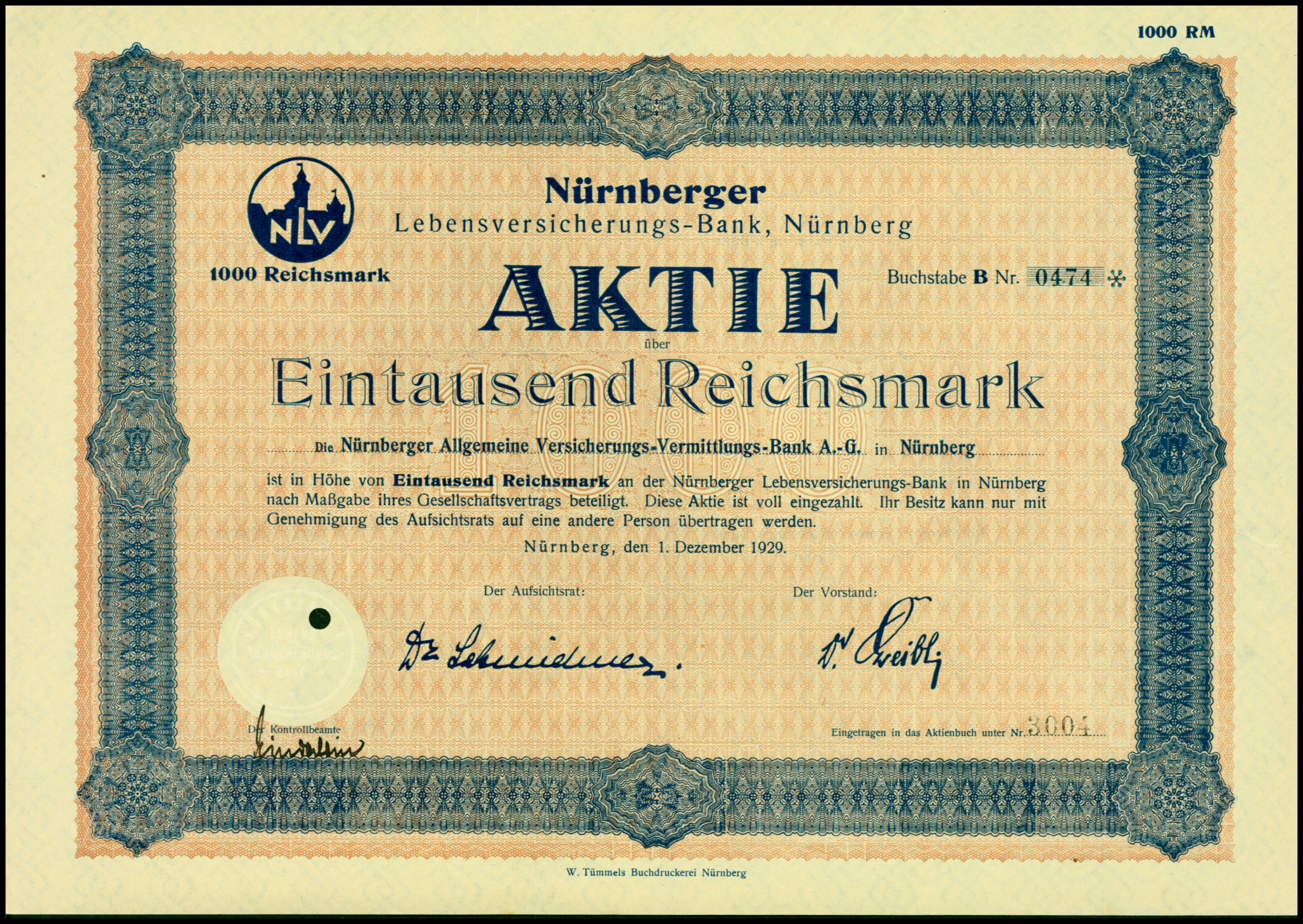
Registered share of 1,000 RM of Nürnberger Lebensversicherungs-Bank dated December 1, 1929

In 1952, the company founded the subsidiary for non-life insurance, Nürnberger Allgemeine Versicherungs-AG, and six years later (1958) created the slogan "Protection and security under the sign of the castle" (Schutz und Sicherheit im Zeichen der Burg). Nürnberger launched the unit-linked life insurance product in 1971. In Salzburg, it founded Nürnberger Versicherung AG Österreich in 1981. Garanta Versicherungs-AG has been offering special products as a professional insurer for the motor vehicle trade, its companies, their employees and customers since 1985. Nürnberger Lebensversicherung AG was transformed into a holding company, Nürnberger Beteiligungs-Aktiengesellschaft, in 1990. The entire life insurance portfolio was transferred to a newly founded subsidiary, which took over the name Nürnberger Lebensversicherung AG. The newly founded Nürnberger Krankenversicherung AG began business operations in 1991. Through participation in Fürst Fugger Privatbank KG, Augsburg, the insurer entered asset management for third parties in 1999.

The Nürnberger Pensionskasse AG commenced business operations in 2003 and the Nürnberger Pensionsfonds AG in 2005. In 2007, the Nürnberger Sofortservice AG was founded. In 2009, the company celebrated its 125th anniversary. The Nürnberger Versicherungsgruppe renamed itself Nürnberger Versicherung in 2016.

== Consortia Versicherungs-Beteiligungsgesellschaft mbH ==
Consortia Versicherungs-Beteiligungsgesellschaft mbH is a holding company based in Nuremberg, Germany, which holds a 25.00% stake in Nürnberger Beteiligungs-Aktiengesellschaft. This shareholding has a value of approximately €194 million (as of the end of 2018). The company is 33.70% owned by Münchener Rückversicherungs-Gesellschaft Aktiengesellschaft, 30.00% by Techno-Einkauf, 26.30% by Nürnberger Verwaltungsgesellschaft mbH, and 10.00% by Versorgungskasse der Nürnberger Versicherungsgruppe e. V..

Currently, Hans-Ulrich Geck and Dietmar Scheck are managing directors.

== Key figures ==
In fiscal 2019, the Group employed an annual average of 4,487 people in Germany, of which 3,800 were office staff and 687 field staff, as well as 128 trainees. In addition, more than 12,200 full-time and part-time intermediaries were active in the five sales channels "Exclusivity," "Brokers, multiple agencies and financial sales," "Car dealership," "Family protection" and "Direct." Annual sales amounted to EUR 4.6 billion. Life insurance accounted for around 2.5 billion euros of the premium income, non-life insurance for 809 million euros and health insurance for 228 million euros. In total, there were around 6.0 million insurance contracts.

== Solidarity with Nuremberg ==
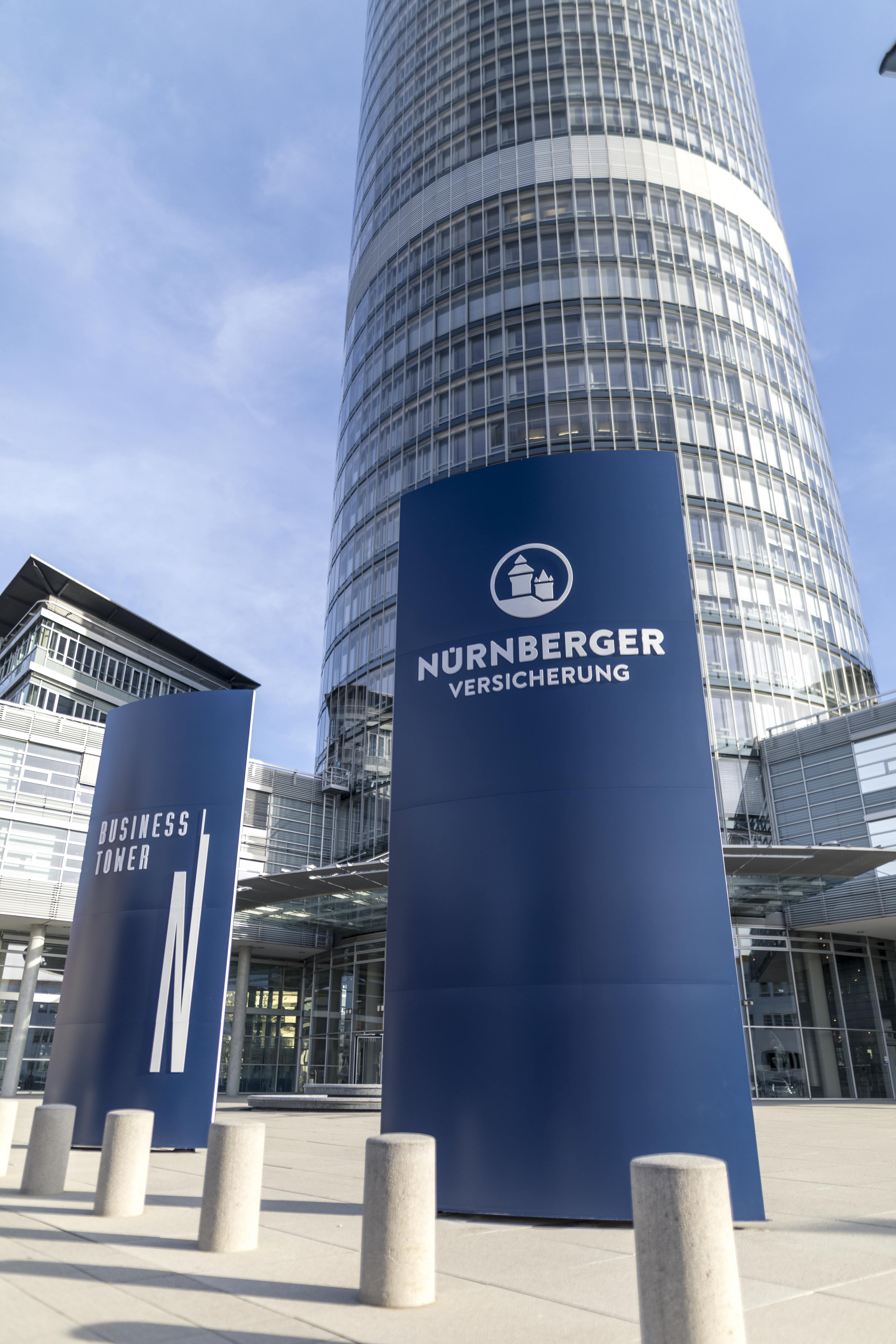
Front view of Business Tower Nuremberg

Since 1928, the logo has represented the silhouette of Nuremberg's Nuremberg Castle. Through this and through the motto "Protection and security under the sign of the castle", which has been known since 1958, the company has found an unmistakable trademark. In December 2016, Nuremberg renewed its brand identity by stylizing the logo and sharpening its slogan ("Protection and security. Since 1884.")("Schutz und Sicherheit. Seit 1884."). The group's headquarters are still located in the city, and in 2000 it moved into a new general headquarters. The so-called Business Tower, located on the eastern ring road, is Bavaria's second-highest office building at 135 meters and 34 stories.

== Sponsoring ==
The company says it is involved as a sponsor in the areas of culture, science, social affairs, and sports.

In 2005, for example, it initiated the International Gluck Opera Festival at the Staatsoper Nürnberg, which has been held every two years since 2008 and of which it was the main sponsor until 2019. With the 2019/2020 season, it has become a premium partner of the Staatstheater Nürnberg. It sponsors the Blaue Nacht cultural event in Nuremberg and has co-financed the Jean Paul walking trail. The company is also the main sponsor of the Christmas City of Nuremberg with its world-famous Christkindlesmarkt.

Nuremberg also sponsors educational projects such as the Bavarian State Mathematics Competition, the Long Night of the Sciences (until 2015), and the Institute of Insurance Economics at the University of Erlangen–Nuremberg.

In 1992, it launched the Nürnberger Burg-Pokal, a tournament series for young dressage horses, and runs projects to promote young talent in equestrian sports in cooperation with numerous state associations. In tennis, the company was the main sponsor of the WTA women's tennis tournament WTA Austrian Open in Austria until 2016, and since 2013 the naming sponsor of the Nuremberg Cup at the home tournament on the grounds of Tennis-Club 1. FC Nürnberg. In May 2019, Nürnberger ended its sponsorship of the Nürnberger Insurance Cup and in December 2019, it also withdrew from grassroots tennis. From 1999 to 2009, Nürnberger was the main sponsor of Equipe Nürnberger Versicherung, the most successful women's cycling team in the world at the time. Projects in the area of social sponsorship include therapeutic riding for Lebenshilfe Nürnberger Land e. V., Bibliothek im Koffer and Bündnis für Familie. As part of the development and implementation of its sustainability strategy, Nürnberger launched its partnership with Bundesverband Kinderhospiz e. V. in February 2020.

In addition, since February 2005, Nürnberger has been the name sponsor of the ice sports and events arena Arena Nürnberger Versicherung.

Furthermore, it has been the new main and jersey sponsor of 1. FC Nürnberg since July 2016. The partnership was initially for three years, and the economic terms were not disclosed. In March 2019, Nürnberger extended its sponsorship by a further three years until 2022. Since 2020, it has also been sponsoring grassroots soccer.
