= Utopian architecture =

Style of architecture inspired by utopianism

Utopian architecture is architecture inspired by utopianism. Examples for such an architecture are Phalanstère, Arcology and Garden Cities. Earthships are realizations of the utopia of sustainable living and autonomous housing. Also, the concept domed city functions as a potential utopia.

== Examples ==
Le Corbusier proposed Ville Contemporaine in 1922 as a planned community, which was not realized. In 1930, Nikolay Milyutin published the idea of Sotsgorod, a utopian linear city for socialism. Frank Lloyd Wright presented the idea of an urban or suburban development concept Broadacre City in 1932.

From 1927 to 1934, Tresigallo was transformed under the supervision of the Fascist Minister of Agriculture Edmondo Rossoni into a utopian city by completely rebuilding it.

Tomáš Baťa developed the concept of a utopian industrial town in the 1920s and 1930s. It was similar to Fordism, introducing mass production into the area of urban planning. The concept was realized in Zlín.

Nowa Huta and Magnitogorsk are examples of entirely planned utopian socialist ideal cities. In January 2021, Saudi Arabia released a short film about plans of a smart linear city The Line, a utopian dream of a postmodern ecotopia. In September 2021, American billionaire Marc Lore announced Telosa, a utopian planned US city.

== Revolutionary architecture ==
Revolutionary architecture refers to the type of architecture that seeks to challenge or overthrow the existing social, political, and economic order through the built environment. It often aims to create spaces that promote social justice, equity, and freedom. Revolutionary architecture is equated with utopian architecture due to insuperable constraints of capitalism. Utopianism played a significant role in the emergence of revolutionary architecture.

== Exhibitions ==
In July 2018 MoMA opened a 6-month exhibition entitled "Toward a Concrete Utopia" that provided visitors with a large collection of images, architectural models, and drawings from Architecture of Yugoslavia from 1948 to 1980. In June 2022, Prof. Leonhard Schenk organized an exhibition of utopian city planning concepts during Long Night of the Sciences in Kreuzlingen.

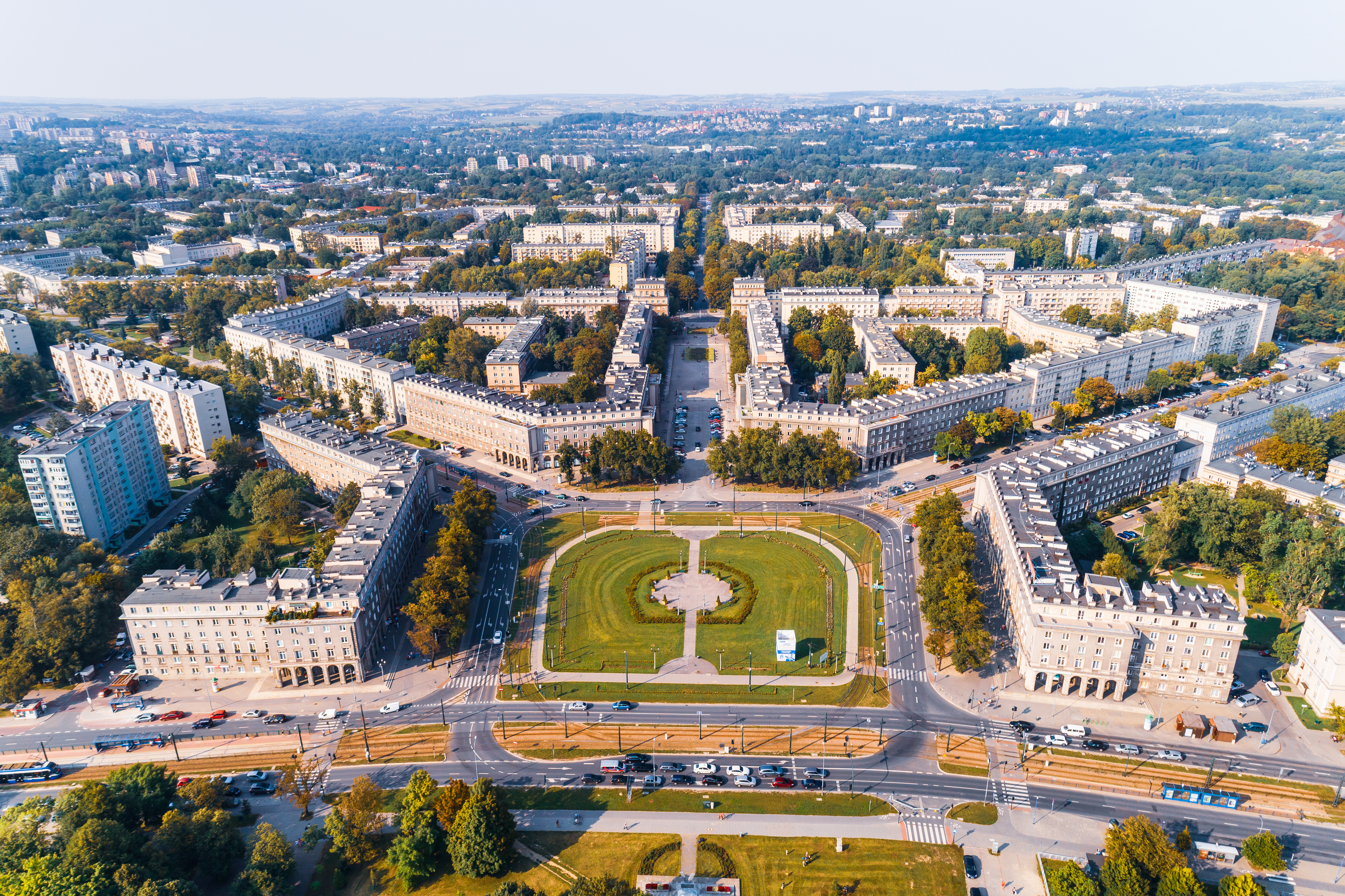
Nowa Huta in Kraków, Poland, serves as an unfinished example of a utopian ideal city. This industrial district boomed in the 1950s, 60s, and 70s. The city is renowned for its architecture.

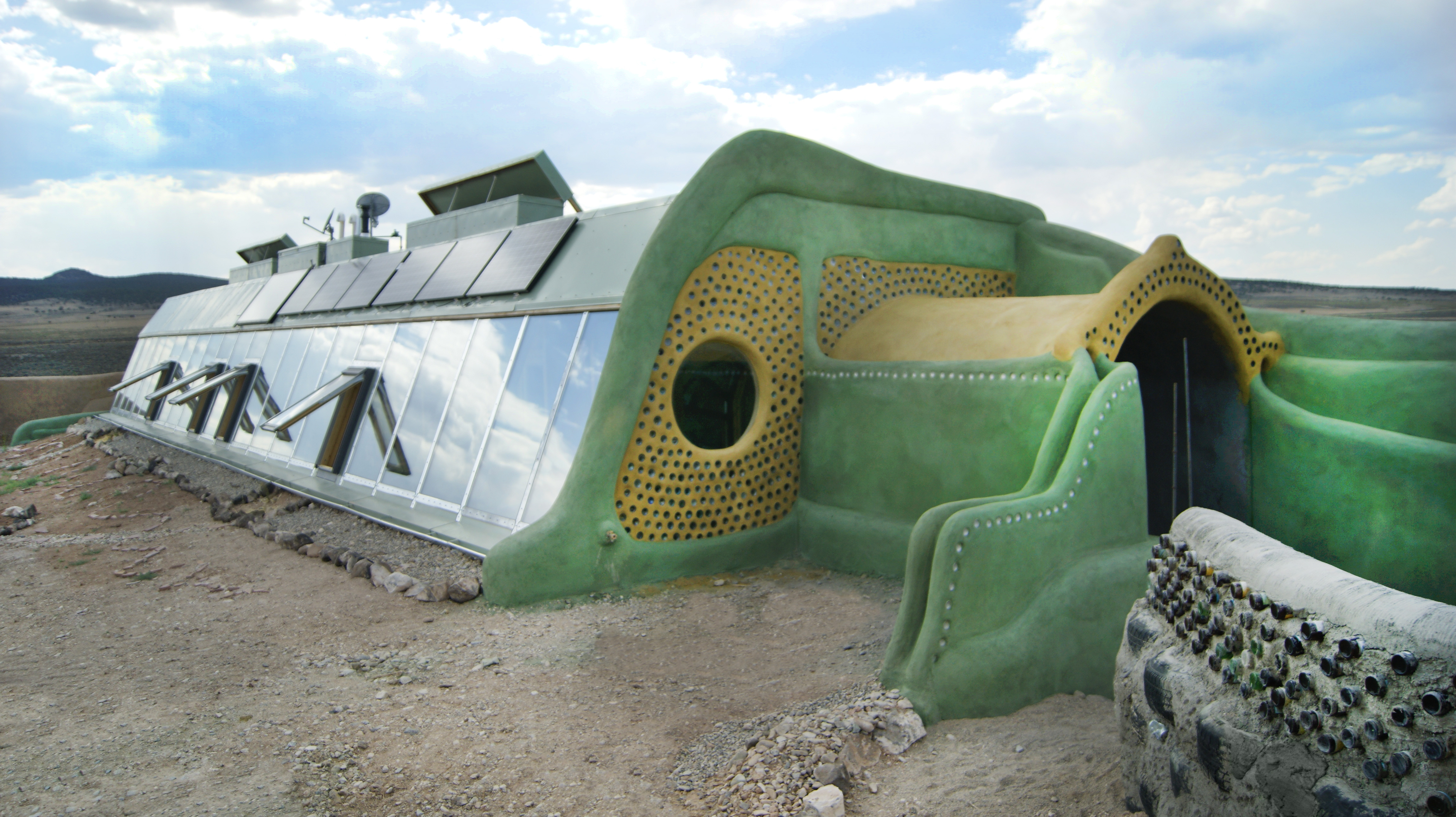
South and East view of an Earthship passive solar home

== See also ==
- Brutalist architecture
- Ecomodernism
- Sotsgorod: Cities for Utopia
- The Almost Nearly Perfect People
- Totalitarian architecture
- Utopia for Realists
- Visionary architecture
