= Humankind: A Hopeful History =

2019 book by Rutger Bregman

- First edition (Dutch)
- Author: Rutger Bregman
- Original title: De Meeste Mensen Deugen: Een Nieuwe Geschiedenis van de Mens
- Translators: Elizabeth Manton; Erica Moore
- Language: English
- Subject: Archeology; Anthropology; Economics; History; Humankind; Humanity (virtue); Philosophy; Psychology
- Genre: Non-fiction, history
- Publisher: Bloomsbury; Little, Brown and Company
- Publication date: September 2019
- Publication place: Netherlands
- English publication date: 13 May 2021
- Media type: Hardcover
- Pages: 496
- Awards: Publieksprijs voor het Nederlandse Boek (2020); Goodreads Choice Award Nominee for History & Biography (2020)
- ISBN: 9781408898932
- OCLC: 1119596186

Humankind: A Hopeful History (Dutch: De Meeste Mensen Deugen: Een Nieuwe Geschiedenis van de Mens) is a 2019 non-fiction book by Dutch historian Rutger Bregman. It was published by Bloomsbury in May 2021. It argues that people are decent at heart and proposes a new worldview based on the corollaries of this optimistic view of human beings. It argues against ideas of humankind's essential egotism and malevolence. The book engages in a multi-disciplinary study of historical events, an examination of scientific studies, and philosophical argumentation in order to advance Bregman's opinion that this outlook is more realistic compared to its negative counterpart. It has been translated into over 30 languages. In the United States, the paperback release was a New York Times Best Seller.

== Summary ==
Humankind argues that humans are fundamentally decent and that more recognition of this view would likely benefit everyone, as cynical expectations of others lead them to become cynical actors themselves. If society were less adamant about the belief that humans are naturally lazy, there would be less reason to oppose the widespread introduction of poverty mitigation measures like basic income. The book takes a multi-disciplinary approach, drawing from history, economics, psychology, biology, anthropology, and archaeology findings. It also uses the state of nature debate between Jean-Jacques Rousseau and Thomas Hobbes as a framing device, siding with Rousseau's position on the matter.

== Reception ==
Reception to Humankind: A Hopeful History was largely positive, although many reviewers have been critical of Bregman's use of sources. Some anthropologists have accused the book of flattening the complexities and diversity of world cultures, although often with the caveat that Bregman's flattening is more accurate than the alternative flattening he argues against. Bregman has, in turn, defended himself on this point by stating that he intended to offer a different perspective on evidence that is, in itself, inconclusive. He maintains that when the context of broader evidence outside of strict anthropology is considered, the evidence supports the thrust of his argument.

In a positive review of the book in Philosophy Now, Tim Moxham said that Bregman "is seeking to unchain us from a dogmatically pessimistic perception of human nature. I believe that he has achieved this." While remaining somewhat unpersuaded of Bregman's position in totality, Moxham argues that this too is keeping with his intentions in writing, saying that "the book's intention is to make you question, and that is absolutely what it does." In the Guardian, Andrew Anthony writes that "there's a great deal of reassuring human decency to be taken from this bold and thought-provoking book and a wealth of evidence in support of the contention that the sense of who we are as a species has been deleteriously distorted." Kirkus Reviews says Humankind: A Hopeful History provides a "powerful argument in favor of human virtue" and "[makes] a convincing case that we're not so bad." Jennifer Bort Yacovissi, writing in the Washington Independent Review of Books, says of Humankind: A Hopeful History that it "makes a compelling and much-needed argument for the innate decency of humans", praising Bregman for "deconstructing the bad science and lazy reportage that has misrepresented primitive societies as being more bloodthirsty and self-destructive than modern civilized ones." She also commends the book for its thorough critiques of how many popular sociological studies are misrepresented in college courses.

In addition to this praise, Humankind: A Hopeful History did receive some criticism, with most criticism directed at the dichotomy set up by Bregman between what he calls the "veneer theory" of human nature, the idea that civilization applies a thin layer of civility atop beings whose true nature is chaotic, and the ideas for which Bregman himself advocates, primarily identified with the thought of Jean-Jacques Rousseau. In Medisch Contact, the doctor Dolf Algra points out, among other things, a careless reference to sources (the original book contains no index, though the 2022 English reprinting does) and the incompleteness of his source research. Simon Burgers, lecturer in research skills and critical thinking at Haagse Hogeschool, alleges that the argumentation in the book is characterized by circular reasoning and cherry picking. The sociologist Kees van Oosten believes that the 10 precepts recommended by Bregman in his book play into the hands of evil rulers in the world: "That is why I think that his book is no good and is just opium for the people." Steven Poole argues in The Guardian that Bregman fails to offer an explanation for the Holocaust, notably the actions of the Nazi leaders themselves. David Livingstone Smith concludes in The Philosopher that although Bregman's project is well-intentioned, it is poorly executed: "Shorn of its essentialism, its blurring of the difference between normative and descriptive claims, its huge inferential leaps and unwarranted assertions, Bregman's project might have made a useful contribution to moral psychology. But as it stands, sadly, the book does not succeed."

== See also ==
- Jean-Jacques Rousseau – Genevan philosopher (1712–1778)
- Thomas Hobbes – English philosopher and political theorist (1588–1679)
- Tongan castaways – Six boys shipwrecked on ʻAta, Tonga, in 1965
