= Disclosing New Worlds =

1997 book about democracy

Disclosing New Worlds: Entrepreneurship, Democratic Action, and the Cultivation of Solidarity
- Author: Fernando Flores; Hubert Dreyfus; Charles Spinosa
- Language: English
- Genre: Non-fiction
- Publication date: 1997

Disclosing New Worlds: Entrepreneurship, Democratic Action, and the Cultivation of Solidarity (1997) is a book co-authored by Fernando Flores, Hubert Dreyfus and Charles Spinosa (a consultant philosopher specializing in commercial innovation). It is a philosophical proposal intended to restore or energize democracy by social constructionism via an argument style of world disclosure but which philosophy is distinct from:

- Relativism, a concept in which points of view have no absolute truth or validity
- Formalism, an emphasis on form over content or meaning in the arts, literature, or philosophy
- Essentialism, the view that, for any specific entity (such as an animal, a group of people, a physical object, a concept), there is a set of attributes which are necessary to its identity and function.

Nevertheless, the authors build on these ideas and seek to reformulate the relationship between democratic rights and economic progress when persistent technological advance obscures an uncertain future for humanity threatened by multiple issues such as peak oil, global warming and environmental degradation. The authors concentrate on three practical activities:

- Social entrepreneurship
- Active citizenship
- Social solidarity.

The authors reason that human beings are at their best when engaged in imaginative and practical innovation rather than in abstract reflection, and thus challenging accepted wisdom and conventional practices within their particular environment, or as the authors claim, when they are making history. History-making, in this account, refers not to political power changes, wars or violent revolution, but to changes in the way people understand their personal qualities and deal with their particular situations.

== Structure of the work ==
World disclosure (German: Erschlossenheit, literally "development or comprehension") is a phenomenon first described by the German philosopher Martin Heidegger in his landmark book Being and Time. As well as the authors of this work, the idea of disclosing has also been discussed by philosophers such as John Dewey, Jürgen Habermas, Nikolas Kompridis and Charles Taylor. It refers to how things become intelligible and meaningfully relevant to ordinary people.

== Conclusion ==
The authors reiterate the importance of history making and identify three types of actors:

- The entrepreneur
- The virtuous citizen
- The cultural leader

Each has to overcome resistance to change, but do so in different ways. Solving puzzles request of each a clear strategic objective, but use different tactics to overcome obstructions. By understanding and disclosing our objectives, and discovering the sort of role we may have to play according to particular situations to reach those goals, all of us can be "history makers" and make changes to our society by changing the shared narrative that binds our particular culture. The authors quote already changed collective attitudes which have recently become much less tolerant of road accidents, various forms of discrimination and repressive public education of young people.

They promote a change to the overarching consumerism as the western world's social and economic order and ideology that encourages the acquisition of goods and services in ever-increasing amounts, in favor of sustainable development within individual communities as a precursor to disclosing a new world order that supports human equality

== Later editions ==
- 1999 a new English language edition was published in United States
- 2000 Version Español was published in Spain

== See also ==
=== Associated books ===
- Utopia (book)
- Utopia for Realists (book)
- Reclaiming Patriotism (book)

=== Related articles ===
- Critical theory
- Critical thinking
- Distribution of wealth
- Ethical socialism
- Georgism
- Income distribution
- Protestant work ethic
- Social justice
- Utopian socialism
