= The Almost Nearly Perfect People =

2014 nonfiction book by Michael Booth

The Almost Nearly Perfect People: The Truth About the Nordic Miracle
- First edition cover
- Author: Michael Booth
- Language: English
- Subject: Nordic countries
- Genre: Non-fiction
- Publisher: Jonathan Cape
- Publication place: United Kingdom
- Pages: 416
- ISBN: 9780224089623

The Almost Nearly Perfect People: The Truth About the Nordic Miracle is a 2014 nonfiction book by the British journalist Michael Booth. In the book, Booth focuses on the five Nordic countries—Denmark, Iceland, Norway, Finland and Sweden—dedicating a section of the book to each one. He began writing the book after migrating from England to Denmark, based on his perceptions of the Nordic region before and after moving. He wanted to present an alternative perspective to the extremely positive depiction of the region in British media. The book received mixed reviews: some critics found it to be overly critical with poor humour, others praised its tone and informativeness.

== Background and release ==
Michael Booth began writing The Almost Nearly Perfect People when he moved from England to Denmark about 15 years before its publication in 2014. Before moving, he had perceived Scandinavians to be a "bearded, woolly jumper-wearing, recycling bunch of people", but afterwards was surprised by how different each of the Nordic countries seemed to be. He wanted to write a book to explore these differences and to explain what he saw as a "fascinating dysfunctional family dynamic" between the five Nordic neighbors. He was further inspired by the "Nordic wave" phenomenon that gained popularity in the 2000s and 2010s when the western world became fascinated with the Nordic countries and their ways of life. In particular, he wanted to investigate Denmark's consistently high scores on various happiness indexes, since these figures conflicted with his own observations that "they didn't seem that happy", and also challenge the perception that the Nordic nations as a group are "little jolly green countries in the north".

Booth undertook four years of research while writing the book, including travelling to each of the countries and interviewing prominent political and cultural figures of each nationality. In writing about each country, he tried to examine both their successes and their weaknesses to "rebalance the utopian view" of Scandinavia held by many British people and to present a different perspective of the region than the extremely positive depiction in a lot of British media. The tone of the book was inspired by Simon Winder's Germania, which combines humour with an historical and travel-based narrative.

The book was published in English on 14 February 2014 by Jonathan Cape. Its first publication, however, was in September 2013 as a Danish translation. Although the manuscript was in English, it was translated and published first in Denmark. On 23 October 2014, the book was translated into Finnish. The Norwegian translation was released the same autumn. The Polish translation came on 7 October 2015.

== Content ==
The Almost Nearly Perfect People is divided into five sections for Denmark, Iceland, Norway, Finland and Sweden. Beginning with Denmark, Booth explains the Danish concept of hygge ("cosy times"), which he sees as conformism. He criticises the Danish population's environmental footprint and notes that their taxation rate and levels of personal debt are among the highest in the world. Moving to Iceland, Booth details the banking practices that led to the collapse of the country's largest banks in the 2008 financial crisis, as well as the popular belief among Icelanders in the existence of Huldufólk (elves).

In Norway, he highlights the rise of far-right politics, the widespread opposition to immigration, and the multiple high-profile Norwegian neo-Nazis. He notes that despite having a "nature-loving" reputation, Norway has a large ecological footprint, and that the sale of fossil fuels accounts for much of the country's wealth. He recounts Finland's history of heavy alcohol consumption and its high rates of murder, suicide, and antipsychotic drug use. He explains the Finnish concept of sisu and what he sees as the resulting obsession with machismo.

Sweden receives Booth's strongest criticism, where consumerist influences are blamed for the apparent downfall of the Nordic model of social democracy and recurrent failures of the Swedish justice system. He argues that Sweden, with its strict rules of social etiquette, has a strong culture of conformity.

Denmark

- Chapter 1 - Happiness
- Chapter 2 - Bacon
- Chapter 3 - Gini
- Chapter 4 - Boffers
- Chapter 5 - Chicken
- Chapter 6 - Vikings
- Chapter 7 - 72 per cent
- Chapter 8 - Hot-tub sanwiches
- Chapter 9 - The bumblebee
- Chapter 10 - Denim dungarees
- Chapter 11 - The Law of Jante
- Chapter 12 - Hygge
- Chapter 13 - Legoland and Other Spiritual Sites
- Chapter 14 - The happiness delusion

Iceland

- Chapter 1 - Hakarl
- Chapter 2 - Bankers
- Chapter 3 - Denmark
- Chapter 4 - Elves
- Chapter 5 - Steam

Norway

- Chapter 1 - Dirndls
- Chapter 2 - Egoiste
- Chapter 3 - The new Quislings
- Chapter 4 - Friluftsliv
- Chapter 5 - Bananas
- Chapter 6 - Dutch disease
- Chapter 7 - Butter

Finland

- Chapter 1 - Santa
- Chapter 2 - Silence
- Chapter 3 - Alcohol
- Chapter 4 - Sweden
- Chapter 5 - Russia
- Chapter 6 - School
- Chapter 7 - Wives

Sweden

- Chapter 1 - Crayfish
- Chapter 2 - Donald Duck
- Chapter 3 - Stockholm syndrome
- Chapter 4 - Integration
- Chapter 5 - Catalonians
- Chapter 6 - Somali pizza
- Chapter 7 - The party
- Chapter 8 - Guilt
- Chapter 9 - Hairnets
- Chapter 10 - Class
- Chapter 11 - Ball bearings

The chapter "Dirndls" states that musician Alexander Rybak is of Russian origin, but Rybak is actually from Belarus.

== Reception ==
The Countries React

"It was interesting to observe the different reactions to my piece. The Finns were pretty cool; the Swedes, pedantic but resigned; the Danes did get a little fighty; the Icelanders were irritated not to have been given more attention; but the Norwegians, boy, they were not happy."

— Michael Booth

The Almost Nearly Perfect People received mixed reviews from critics:

- Mariella Frostrup described the book for The Guardian as a "comprehensive and occasionally downright hilarious explanation of the Nordic miracle" and praised its "companionable, lightly mocking tone".
- Alwyn Turner gave the book 4 (out of 5) stars in a review for The Daily Telegraph, writing that "if [Booth's] tone is sometimes a little too jokey, his enthusiasm is contagious" and that "the real joy of the book" lay in the collection of interesting trivia.
- The Literary Review's Bernard Porter found the book to be "a thoroughly entertaining read, written brilliantly", but criticised its largely impressionistic nature and the lack of sources and references.
- Ian Thomson of The Guardian described the book as "informative, if strenuously humorous", but felt that Booth's "schoolboy humour" was at times "pretty embarrassing".
- Anna Vesterinen, writing for the Rationalist Association, felt that Booth relied too much on quoted studies and surveys and ought to have included more interviews with "ordinary locals".
- The Financial Times' Richard Milne wrote that, despite Booth's tendency to reinforce some stereotypes, "Behind the jokey tone is a lot of good material", and described the book as "a welcome rejoinder to those who cling to the idea of the Nordic region as a promised land".
- Sara Steensig opined in the GBTimes that the book's section on Iceland was somewhat superficial and that Booth's analysis of Sweden was too critical, but nevertheless, "while he does make a lot of fun of the Nordic countries, I think you can feel his affection for the inhabitants too."
- A Norwegian book review, in Aftenposten, found that the chapters about Denmark and Finland were the most profoud, whereas Iceland received too little attention. The overall impression was that readers from the five countries would find it somewhat shallow, and the book was made for an external audience. Booth was "witty" and "delightful", but the book was too light-hearted to be considered "serious prose".

== See also ==
- Utopia for Realists
- Utopian architecture
