= Rutger Bregman =

Dutch journalist, writer, and historian (born 1988)

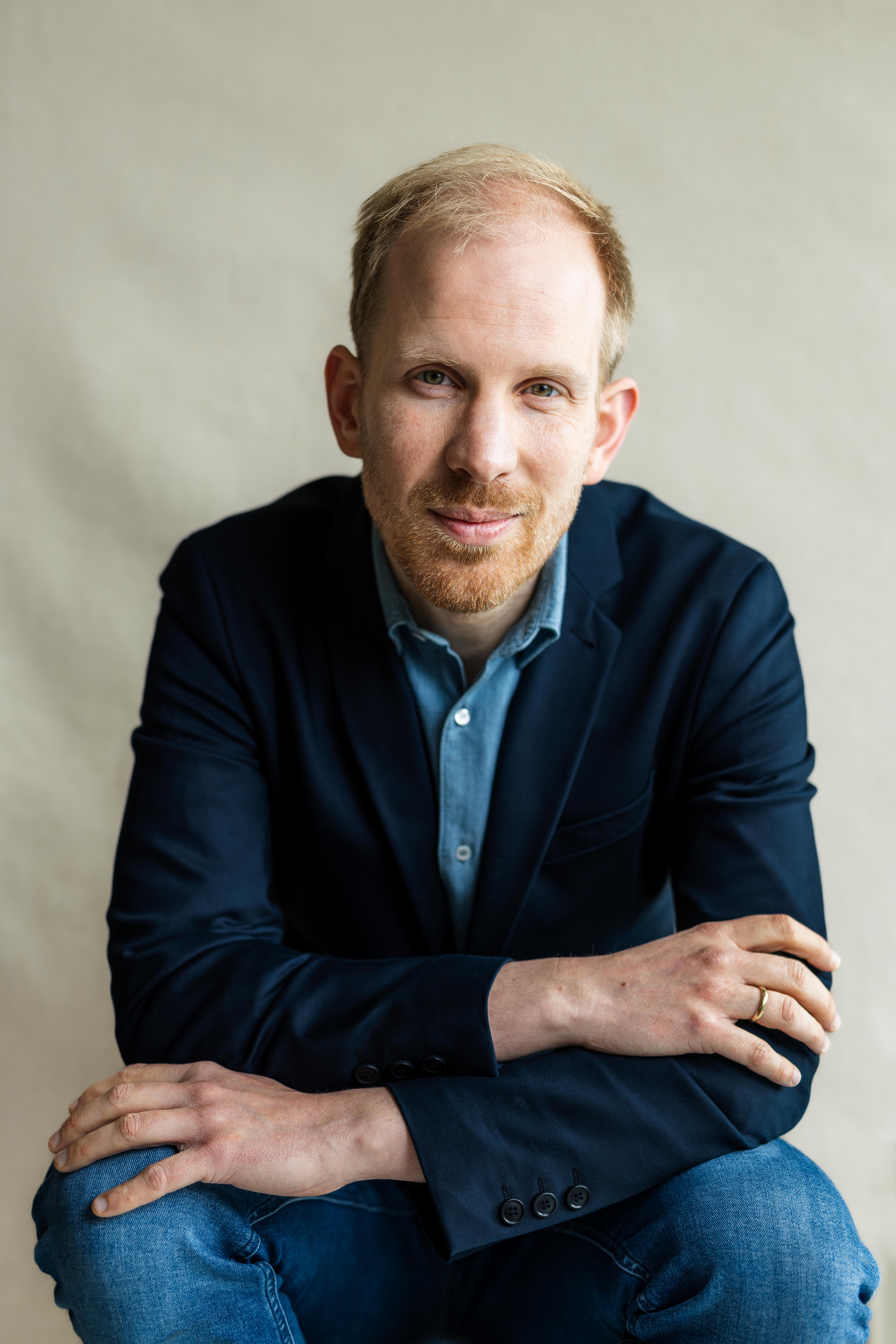
- Bregman in 2024
- Born: Rutger Christiaan Bregman; 26 April 1988 (age 38); Renesse, Netherlands
- Education: Utrecht University (BA); University of California, Los Angeles (MA)
- Occupations: Historian and author
- Known for: Universal basic income, working hours and open borders
- Notable work: Utopia for Realists; Humankind: A Hopeful History
- Spouse: Maartje ter Horst
- Children: 2
- Website: www.rutgerbregman.com

Rutger Christiaan Bregman (born 26 April 1988) is a Dutch historian and author.

Bregman published four books, most notably Utopia for Realists, which has been translated into thirty-two languages. His work has been featured in The Washington Post, The Guardian and by the BBC. He has been described by The Guardian as the "Dutch wunderkind of new ideas" and by TED Talks as "one of Europe's most prominent young thinkers". His TED Talk, "Poverty Isn't a Lack of Character; It's a Lack of Cash", was chosen by TED curator Chris Anderson as one of the top ten of 2017.

== Early life and education ==
Bregman was born in Renesse. His father is a Protestant minister, while his mother is a special needs teacher. He earned his Bachelor of Arts in history at Utrecht University in 2009. He earned his Master of Arts in history in 2012, partly at Utrecht and partly at the University of California, Los Angeles. His graduate studies concentrated on cities, states and citizenship. He was a member of Christian student association SSR-NU.

== Career ==
Bregman thought of becoming an academic historian, but began working as a journalist instead. He worked about 10 years in what he calls the "awareness industry", before quitting journalism, after what he called an early midlife crisis and becoming an entrepreneur though he still writes for the online journal De Correspondent, He was twice nominated for the European Press Prize for his work there. His articles have also been published in The Guardian, The Washington Post, Evonomics, and The Conversation.

In November 2025, Bregman, who lives in the US, gave the first of four Reith Lectures for the BBC on the "Moral Revolution" arguing for a realist utopia. He wished to state in his lecture that Donald Trump was the "most openly corrupt president in American history". When the BBC censored his intended statement upon advice of its lawyers before the broadcast, Bregman expressed surprise and objected to the censorship, describing the BBC as "bending the knee to authoritarianism". The BBC forbade its staff from quoting the censored line in communication with the media.

=== Utopia for Realists ===
In 2014 Bregman published Utopia for Realists (Dutch title: Gratis geld voor iedereen) which promotes a more productive and equitable life based on three core ideas: a universal basic income paid to everybody, a short work week of fifteen hours work time, and open borders worldwide with the free exchange of citizens between all nations. It was originally written as a series of articles for the Dutch online journal De Correspondent.

In an interview with the Montreal newspaper Le Devoir in September 2017, Bregman said that "to move forward, a society needs dreams, not nightmares. Yet people are caught in the logic of fear. Whether it is Trump, Brexit or the last elections in Germany, they vote against the future and instead for solutions to replace it, believing the past was better based on a thoroughly mistaken view of the world: the world was worse before … Humanity is improving, conditions of life, work and health too. And it's time to open the windows of our minds to see it."

=== Humankind: A Hopeful History ===
In September 2019, Bregman published Humankind: A Hopeful History (Dutch title: De meeste mensen deugen), where he argues that humans are fundamentally mostly decent, and that more recognition of this view would likely be beneficial to everyone, partly as it would reduce excessive cynicism and misanthropy. For example, if society was less adamant on the view that humans are naturally lazy, there would be less reason to oppose the widespread introduction of poverty mitigation measures like universal basic income. The book takes a multi-disciplinary approach, drawing from the findings of history, economics, psychology, biology, anthropology and archaeology. Bregman's arguments include the assertion that in the state of nature debate, Rousseau, rather than Hobbes, was more correct about humanity's essential goodness. An English translation was published in May 2020. The paperback release was a New York Times Best Seller. In addition to praise, Humankind: A Hopeful History has also received strong criticism. Various critics, for example, point to the book's lack of scientific content.

=== Moral Ambition ===
In May 2025, Bregman published Moral Ambition which he says he wrote at a time of midlife crisis, experiencing moral envy with the doers and shakers, and desired to "have skin in the game". He said it "would be the last book for quite some time". In the book, he challenges conventional career success metrics (such as high salaries and prestigious titles) and urges professionals to redirect their talents toward addressing pressing global issues like climate change, inequality, and pandemics. Everything earned by the author through this book will be used to fund the Dutch non-profit foundation The School for Moral Ambition.

==== The School for Moral Ambition ====
The School for Moral Ambition is a Dutch non-profit foundation cofounded, in 2024, by Bregman, Harald Dunnink, Jan-Willem van Putten, Julia van Boven and Ruben Timmerman. Bregman also stated that he has stepped down from the board of the foundation, and no longer has direct control over spending decisions, to avoid any conflict of interest.

=== Other activities ===
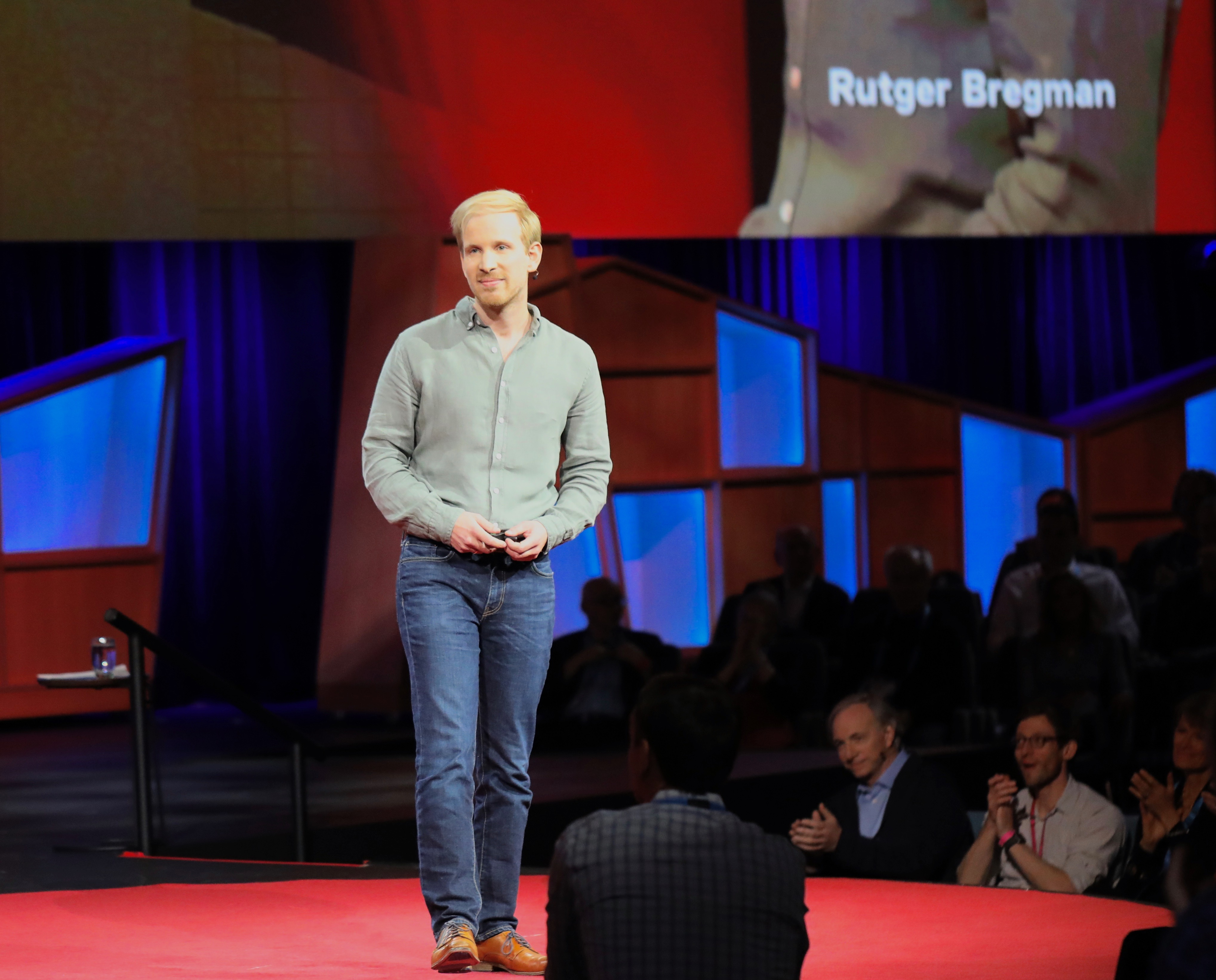
A TED Talk by Bregman in 2017

In a TED presentation titled "Poverty Isn't a Lack of Character; It's a Lack of Cash" in April 2017, Bregman argued for a universal basic income as the solution to end poverty.

In January 2019, Bregman took part in a panel debate at the World Economic Forum in Davos, where he criticised the event for its focus on philanthropy rather than tax avoidance and the need for fair taxation. His intervention was widely reported and followed on social media.

A month after his Davos appearance, Bregman was interviewed remotely by Fox News anchor and journalist Tucker Carlson, with a recording originally being scheduled to air at a later point. Bregman told Carlson that the United States "could easily crack down on tax paradises" if they wanted to and that Fox News would not cover stories about tax evasion by the wealthy. He said that Carlson himself had been taking "dirty money" for years from the CATO Institute where he was senior fellow and which is "funded by Koch billionaires", Charles Koch and David Koch. He said that Carlson and other Fox News anchors are "millionaires paid by billionaires", referring to the Murdochs and, in Carlson's case, the Koch brothers. Bregman told Carlson that "what the Murdochs want you to do [on Fox News] is scapegoat immigrants instead of talking about tax avoidance". Carlson was angered by Bregman's comments, calling him a "moron" and telling him to "go fuck [himself]". Carlson later apologized for using profane language, but declared his comments towards Bregman were "genuinely heartfelt". A recording of the interview from Bregman's point of view was obtained by NowThis News, who released the video on 20 February 2019. It later exceeded four million views on YouTube.

In 2023, he was a guest in the Dutch television program Van Rossem Vertelt of his colleague historian Maarten van Rossem where they philosophised about the next 80 years.

Bregman gave the 2025 BBC Reith Lectures, entitled “Moral Revolution".

=== Views ===
The major themes of Bregman's works include universal basic income, the workweek and open borders. As of 2016, Bregman approvingly cited a 1968 US proposal for a guaranteed minimum income, put forward by President Richard Nixon, among others. He also cites a 1974–1979 Canadian federal government project in Dauphin, Manitoba, that temporarily eradicated poverty. Bregman proposed a 15-hour workweek.

Following his first Reith Lecture, Bregman called himself an old-fashioned social democrat.

=== Publications ===
- Met de kennis van toen: actuele problemen in het licht van de geschiedenis (With the knowledge of back then: current problems in a historical light). Amsterdam: De Bezige Bij, 2012, ISBN 978-90-2347212-4.
- De geschiedenis van de vooruitgang (The history of progress). Amsterdam, De Bezige Bij, 2013, ISBN 978-90-2347754-9 which won the Liberales book prize for best Dutch-language nonfiction book of 2013.
- Gratis geld voor iedereen: en nog vijf grote ideeën die de wereld kunnen veranderen. Amsterdam: De Correspondent, 2014, ISBN 978 90 822 5630 7. English translation: Utopia for realists, and how we can get there (2014).
- Waarom vuilnismannen meer verdienen dan bankiers (Why dustmen deserve more than bankers), with Jesse Frederik. Rotterdam: Maand van de Filosofie, 2015, ISBN 9789047706830.
- De meeste mensen deugen, een nieuwe geschiedenis van de mens. Amsterdam: De Correspondent, 2019, ISBN 9789082942187. English translation: Humankind: A Hopeful History (2020).
- Het water komt: een brief aan alle Nederlanders (The water is coming: a letter to all Netherlanders). Amsterdam: De Correspondent, 2020, ISBN 9789083017761.
- Moral Ambition: Stop Wasting Your Talent and Start Making a Difference, Bloomsbury Publishing, 2025, ISBN 9781526680600

== Personal life ==
Bregman is married to Maartje ter Horst, a photographer. He previously resided in Houten. As of May 2025, they resided in Brooklyn and have two children.

In April 2021, Bregman became a member of Giving What We Can, a community of people who have pledged to give at least 10% of their income to effective charities.

He was influenced by his mother to become vegan.
