= Michael Booth (writer) =

English food and travel writer

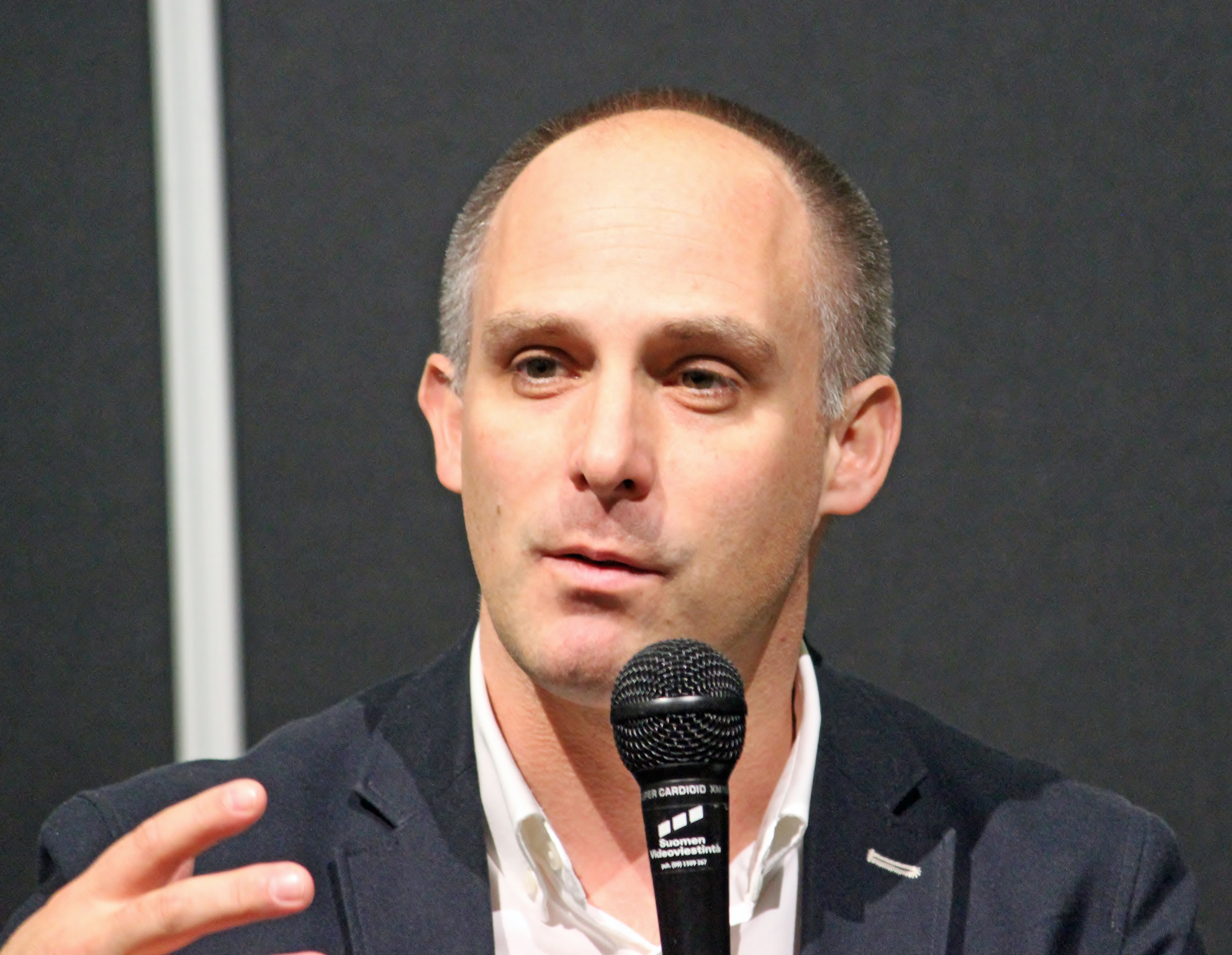
- Booth at Helsinki Book Fair in October 2014.
- Occupations: Food and travel writer and journalist
- Spouse: Lissen
- Children: Asger and Emil
- Writing career
- Notable awards: Guild of Food Writers Kate Whiteman Award for Work on Food and Travel
- Website: www.michael-booth.com

Michael Booth is an English food and travel writer and journalist who writes regularly for a variety of newspapers and magazines including the Independent on Sunday, Condé Nast Traveller, Monocle, and Time Out. He also writes for the Danish newspaper Politiken.

== Career ==
In June 2010, Booth won the Guild of Food Writers Kate Whiteman Award for Work on Food and Travel. His book on Japanese cooking, Sushi and Beyond: What the Japanese Know About Cooking, was adapted into a Japanese anime television series which began airing in April 2015. This was followed in 2014 by his book The Almost Nearly Perfect People: The Truth About the Nordic Miracle, which he first began writing when he moved from England to Denmark about 15 years before its publication.

== Personal life ==
Booth has a wife, Lissen, and two children, Asger and Emil. They live in Denmark.

== Bibliography ==
- Just As Well I'm Leaving: To the Orient with Hans Christian Andersen (2005)
- Sacré Cordon Bleu: What the French Know About Cooking (2008)
- Doing without Delia: Tales of Triumph and Disaster in a French Kitchen (2009)
- Sushi and Beyond: What the Japanese Know About Cooking (2009)
  - Super Sushi Ramen Express: One Family's Journey Through the Belly of Japan (retitled US reprint) (2016)
- Eat, Pray, Eat: One Man's Accidental Search for Equanimity, Equilibrium and Enlightenment (2011)
- The Almost Nearly Perfect People: The Truth About the Nordic Miracle (2014)
- The Meaning of Rice: a culinary tour of Japan (2017)
- Three Tigers, One Mountain: A Journey Through the Bitter History and Current Conflicts of China, Korea, and Japan (2020)
