= Long Night of the Sciences =

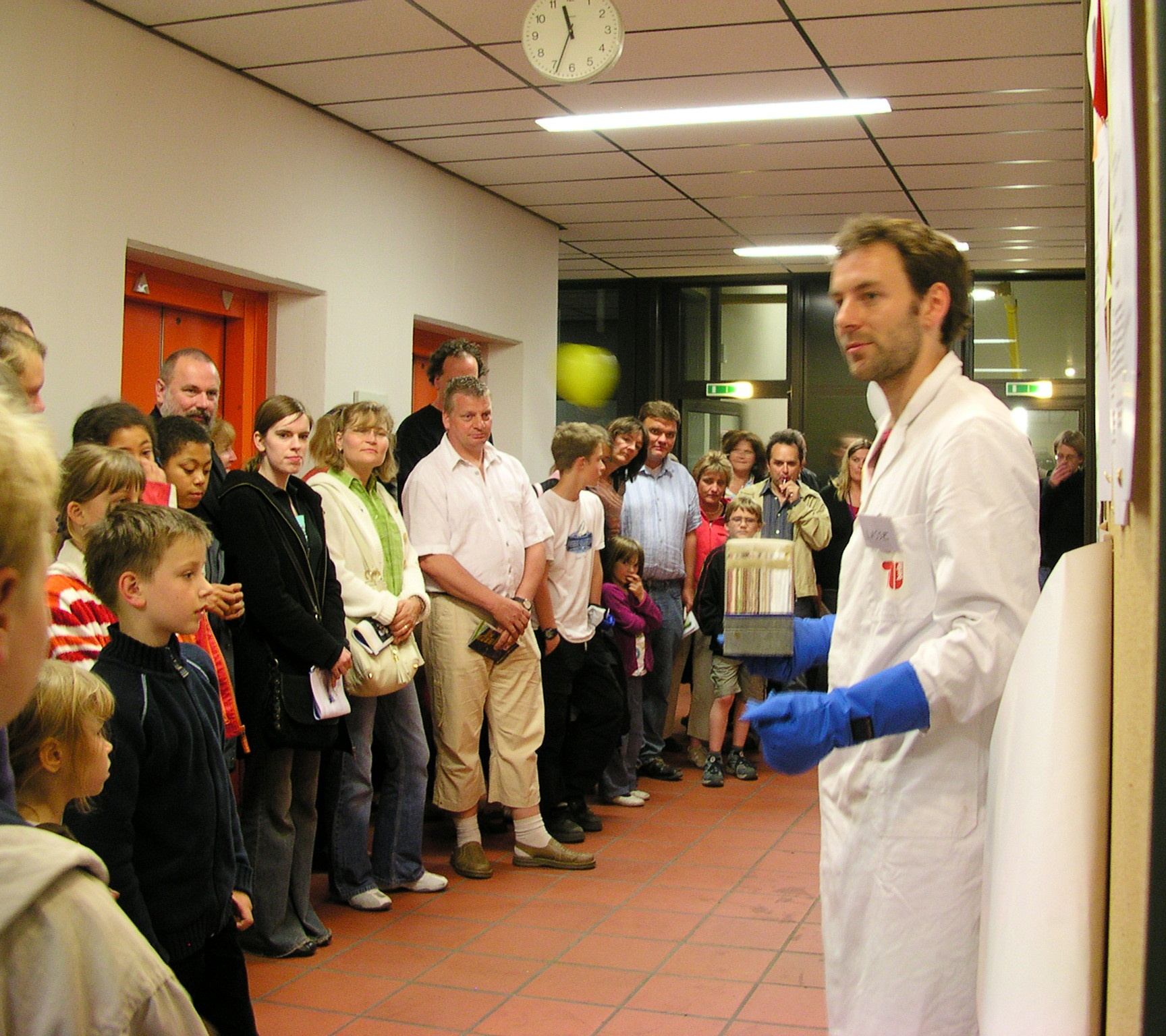
The event at TU Berlin in 2006

The Long Night of the Sciences (German: Lange Nacht der Wissenschaften) is an established form of public relations and science communication activity in Germany. On one night of the year, large scientific institutions hold lectures and demonstrations for the general public in order to present themselves and a general overview of their research topics. The events cover all aspects of science, from natural sciences, arts and humanities to social sciences. The public can usually visit the institutions between around 5pm and 1am on the "Long Night of the Sciences" in exchange for a fee.

== Origin ==
The format of the event is inspired by the successful Long Night of Museums in Berlin. The event first took place as part of the Science Summer 2000 (German: Wissenschaftssommer 2000) event in Bonn. Berlin organized a similar event the following year and gained a larger response, with a total of 61,972 visitors.

== Distribution ==
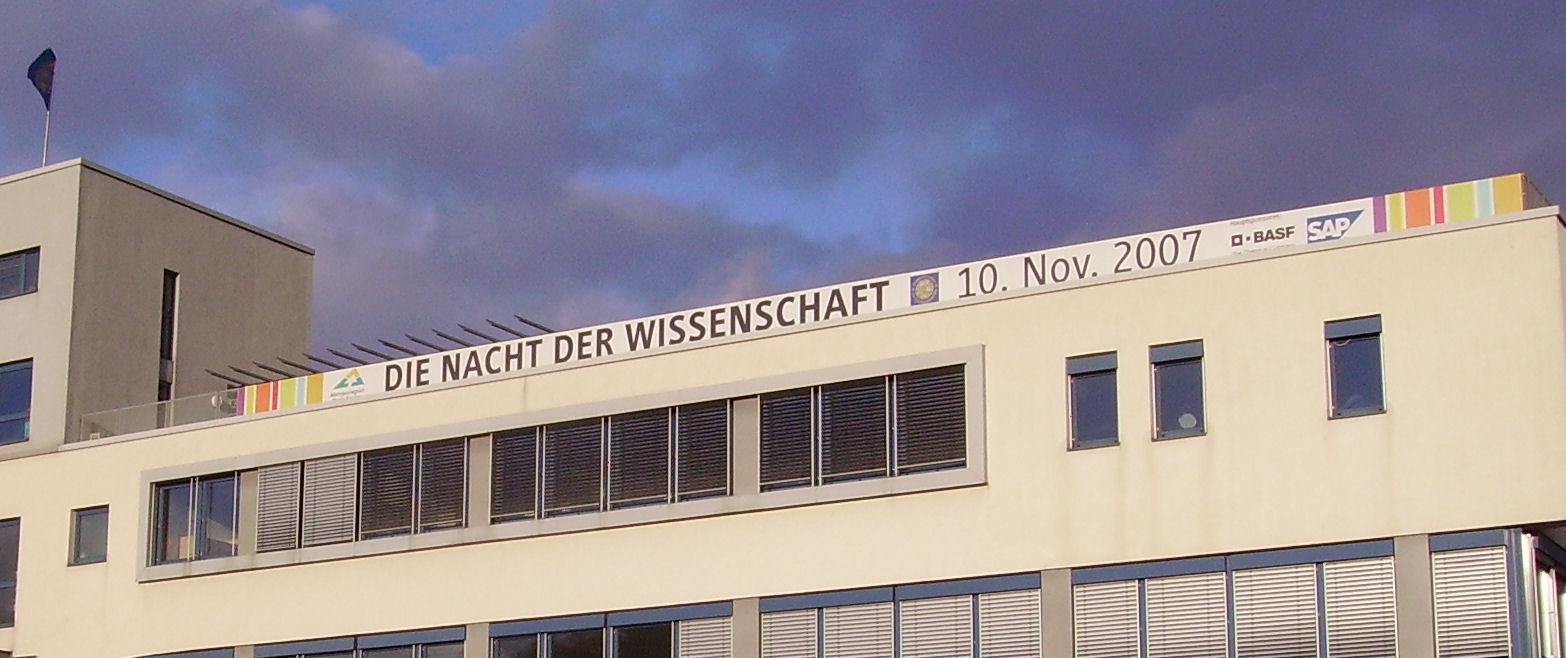
Advertisement for the event in the Rhine-Neckar metropolitan region

Besides Berlin, this event format has also been successfully implemented in other scientific locations, including:

- Hamburg (since 2005)
- Halle (since 2001)
- Dresden (since 2002)
- Rostock
- Aachen (since 2003)
- Nuremberg/Fürth/Erlangen (since 2003)
- Tübingen, Jena (since 2005)
- Stuttgart (2006)
- Erfurt, Duisburg-Essen (since 2007)
- Freiberg (since 2007)
- Heidelberg, Mannheim, Ludwigshafen (since 2007)
- Garching (since 2007)
- Leipzig (since 2008)
- Magdeburg
- Frankfurt (since 2006)
- Hannover (since 2011)
- Ilmenau (since 2007)

== Berlin and Potsdam ==
The program for the 9th "Long Night of the Sciences" in Berlin and Potsdam on 13 June 2009 featured more than 2,000 individual events held by 67 participants in 160 buildings. 15 special bus routes were provided for the night. There were around 238,750 visitors in total.

== Nuremberg, Fürth, Erlangen ==
Long Night of the Sciences

Official website
- https://nacht-der-wissenschaften.de/

"The Long Night of the Sciences" in Nuremberg, Fürth and Erlangen debuted in 2003 and is held every two years, its 12th edition taking place on Saturday, October 25, 2025. Covering a broad array of natural sciences, social sciences, and applied sciences, the event's mission is to make research accessible to the broader public and to create an educational community event. During the children’s program in the afternoon and long into the night, exhibitions, experiments, and presentations are open to over 20,000 visitors across ca. 150 locations in Nuremberg, Fürth, and Erlangen.The individual events are hosted by over 300 institutions, among them universities, research institutions, and companies with a strong focus on research.

== See also ==
- Long Night of Museums
