= Utopia for Realists =

2016 book by Rutger Bregman

Utopia for Realists: The Case for a Universal Basic Income, Open Borders, and a 15-hour Workweek
- First edition (Dutch)
- Author: Rutger Bregman
- Audio read by: Peter Noble
- Original title: Gratis geld voor iedereen
- Translator: Elizabeth Manton
- Language: Dutch
- Publisher: De Correspondent
- Publication date: 2014
- Publication place: Netherlands
- Media type: Print
- Pages: 288
- ISBN: 978-9082520347
- OCLC: 1039088412

Utopia for Realists: The Case for a Universal Basic Income, Open Borders, and a 15-hour Workweek (alternatively subtitled And How We Can Get There and How We Can Build the Ideal World) is a 2014 book by Dutch popular historian Rutger Bregman. It was originally written as articles in Dutch for a virtual journal, De Correspondent, and was since compiled and published, and translated into several languages. It offers a critical proposal that it claims is a practical approach to reconstructing modern society to promote a more productive and equitable life based on three core ideas:

- a universal basic income paid to everybody
- a short working week of fifteen hours
- open borders worldwide with the free movement of citizens between all states

== Thesis ==
=== Rationale ===
As a result of the advance of international trade and economic science in recent decades, globalization has radically transformed the traditional social and economic order from smaller, connected nations to a new world economy which, while already demonstrably capable of rescuing millions of people from poverty, could be extended to the entire human species.

However, the new global system unfairly compensates a few rich countries, and, with the progressive substitution of human capital with automation and robotics, has also generated an increase in inequality, both between the investment community and its workforce within the G20 states as well as between developed countries and their developing neighbours.

=== Justification ===
Each idea is supported by multiple academic studies and anecdotal evidence including numerous success stories, quoting Richard Nixon's 1968 plan for a basic income for Americans, the Mincome project in the Canadian city of Dauphin, Manitoba, which "eliminated poverty" and reduced hospitalisation rates, and the perceived success of the Schengen Agreement.

== Reception ==
In her review for The Independent, Caroline Lucas described the book as a "brilliantly written and unorthodox page-turner."

Writing for The Observer, Will Hutton said, "You may not dream the same dreams as Bregman – but he invites you to take dreaming seriously. For that alone, this book is worth a read."

== See also ==
- Utopian socialism
- Ethical socialism
- Georgism
- Social justice
- Disclosing New Worlds, a 1997 book
