= Participatory media =

Communication media where the audience can play an active role

Participatory media is communication media where the audience can play an active role in the process of collecting, reporting, analyzing and disseminating content. Citizen / participatory journalism, citizen media, empowerment journalism and democratic media are related principles.

Participatory media includes community media, blogs, wikis, RSS, tagging and social bookmarking, music-photo-video sharing, mashups, podcasts, participatory video projects and videoblogs. All together they can be described as "e-services, which involve end-users as active participants in the value creation process". However, "active [...] uses of media are not exclusive to our times". "In the history of mediated communication we can find many variations of participatory practices. For instance, the initial phase of the radio knew many examples of non-professional broadcasters".

Marshall McLuhan discussed the participatory potential of media already in the 1970s but in the era of digital and social media, the theory of participatory culture becomes even more acute as the borders between audiences and media producers blurred.

== Characteristics ==
These distinctly different media share three common, interrelated characteristics:

- Many-to-many media now make it possible for every person connected to the network to broadcast and receive text, images, audio, video, software, data, discussions, transactions, computations, tags, or links to and from every other person. The asymmetry between broadcaster and audience that was dictated by the structure of pre-digital technologies dictated has changed radically. This is a technical-structural characteristic.
- Participatory media are social media whose value and power derives from the active participation of many people. This is a psychological and social characteristic. One example is StumbleUpon.
- Social networks, when amplified by information and communication networks, enable broader, faster, and lower cost coordination of activities. This is an economic and political characteristic.

Full-fledged participatory news sites include NowPublic, OhmyNews, DigitalJournal.com, On the Ground News Reports and GroundReport.

With participatory media, the boundaries between audiences and creators become blurred and often invisible. In the words of David Sifry, the founder of Technorati, a search engine for blogs, one-to-many "lectures" (i.e., from media companies to their audiences) are transformed into "conversations" among "the people formerly known as the audience". This changes the tone of public discussions. The mainstream media, says David Weinberger, a blogger, author and fellow at Harvard University's Berkman Center for Internet & Society, "don't get how subversive it is to take institutions and turn them into conversations". That is because institutions are closed, assume a hierarchy and have trouble admitting fallibility, he says, whereas conversations are open-ended, assume equality and eagerly concede fallibility.

Some proposed that journalism can be more "participatory" because the World Wide Web has evolved from "read-only" to "read-write". In other words, in the past only a small proportion of people had the means (in terms of time, money, and skills) to create content that could reach large audiences. Now the gap between the resources and skills needed to consume online content versus the means necessary to produce it have narrowed significantly to the point that nearly anyone with a web-connected device can create media. As Dan Gillmor, founder of the Center for Citizen Media declared in his 2004 book We the Media, journalism is evolving from a lecture into a conversation. He also points out that new interactive forms of media have blurred the distinction between producers of news and their audience. In fact, some view the term "audience" to be obsolete in the new world of interactive participatory media. New York University professor and blogger Jay Rosen refers to them as "the people formerly known as the audience." In "We Media", a treatise on participatory journalism, Shayne Bowman and Chris Willis suggest that the "audience" should be renamed "participants". One of the first projects encompassing participatory media prior to the advent of social media was The September 11 Photo Project. The exhibit was a not-for-profit community based photo project in response to the September 11 attacks and their aftermath. It provided a venue for the display of photographs accompanied by captions by anyone who wished to participate. The Project aimed to preserve a record of the spontaneous outdoor shrines that were being swept away by rain or wind or collected by the city for historical preservation.

Some even proposed that "all mass media should be abandoned", extending upon one of the four main arguments given by Jerry Mander in his case against television: Corporate domination of television used to mould humans for a commercial environment, and all mass media involve centralized power. Blogger Robin Good wrote, "With participatory media instead of mass media, governments and corporations would be far less able to control information and maintain their legitimacy... To bring about true participatory media (and society), it is also necessary to bring about participatory alternatives to present economic and political structures... In order for withdrawal from using the mass media to become more popular, participatory media must become more attractive: cheaper, more accessible, more fun, more relevant. In such an atmosphere, nonviolent action campaigns against the mass media and in support of participatory media become more feasible."

Although 'participatory media' has been viewed uncritically by many writers, others, such as Daniel Palmer, have argued that media participation must also "be understood in relation to defining characteristics of contemporary capitalism – namely its user-focused, customised and individuated orientation."

== See also ==
- Citizen media
- Public-access television
- Public participation
- Social media
