= Brock Meeks =

American journalist

Brock N. Meeks is an American investigative journalist. He founded the online publication CyberWire Dispatch in 1994 and helped pioneer the world of online journalism. At its peak, Meeks estimated that CyberWire Dispatch was distributed to more than 800,000 readers via mailing lists and newsgroups. At the height of his online career, Meeks was "the most widely read reporter in cyberspace" according to J. D. Lasica. CyberWire Dispatch officially ceased publication in early 2004.

Meeks's articles focused on the intersection of government and technology, and explored issues such as online rights – including free speech and the right to privacy – encryption, censorship, and the regulation of content.

Meeks was the first journalist sued for libel in cyberspace while writing his CyberWire Dispatch. Journalist and author Dan Gillmor wrote in his book We the Media: "[Meeks] was, by most accounts, the first Internet journalist to be sued for libel. For all practical purposes, Meeks won the case; he paid nothing to the Ohio company that sued him over his critical report about the company's business practices, though he did agree to notify the company before publishing anything else about it or the man who ran it. Meeks did pay his lawyers, including several noted First Amendment specialists who donated the vast majority of their time. He was lucky, in a sense, because his case drew the attention of people who wanted to protect our rights."

In the mid-1990s, Meeks was the Washington correspondent for Wired and its online counterpart, HotWired. He wrote features for the magazine and produced two columns for HotWired: "Muckraker" and "Campaign Dispatch". The latter was dedicated to his coverage of the 1996 U.S. presidential campaign.

From 1997 to 2006, Meeks served as chief Washington correspondent for MSNBC.com, covering a variety of policy-related technology topics, including civil liberties and legislative attempts to control the Internet.

After the attacks of September 11, 2001, Meeks created and developed the homeland security beat for MSNBC.com. His work on national security won him the Carnegie Mellon Cybersecurity Journalism award in 2005.

During his ten years with MSNBC.com, Meeks appeared regularly on TV for MSNBC cable and did occasional on-air spots for NBC Nightly News. He also won an award from the Online News Association as part of a special projects team that produced "Rising from Ruin", a multimedia project chronicling the recovery of two small Gulf Coast communities in the aftermath of Hurricane Katrina.

Meeks was a founding staff member of the Inter@ctive Week magazine (in 2001 the magazine merged with ZD publication eWeek) where he served as chief Washington correspondent. Before that he spent two years as senior editor for Communications Daily, where two of his stories—one on the possible medical risk of cellular telephones and another on how cell phones were causing deadly interference with critical medical devices—moved Congress to hold hearings. In the latter case, hospitals also established no-cell phone zones.

In 2007 Meeks joined the Center for Democracy and Technology, a Washington-based, non-profit public interest group, as Director of Communications.

In 2013 Meeks joined Atlantic Media where he worked as executive editor for Atlantic 57. He left Atlantic 57 in November 2018 to return to a freelance writing career.
