= IReport =

Citizen journalism initiative by CNN

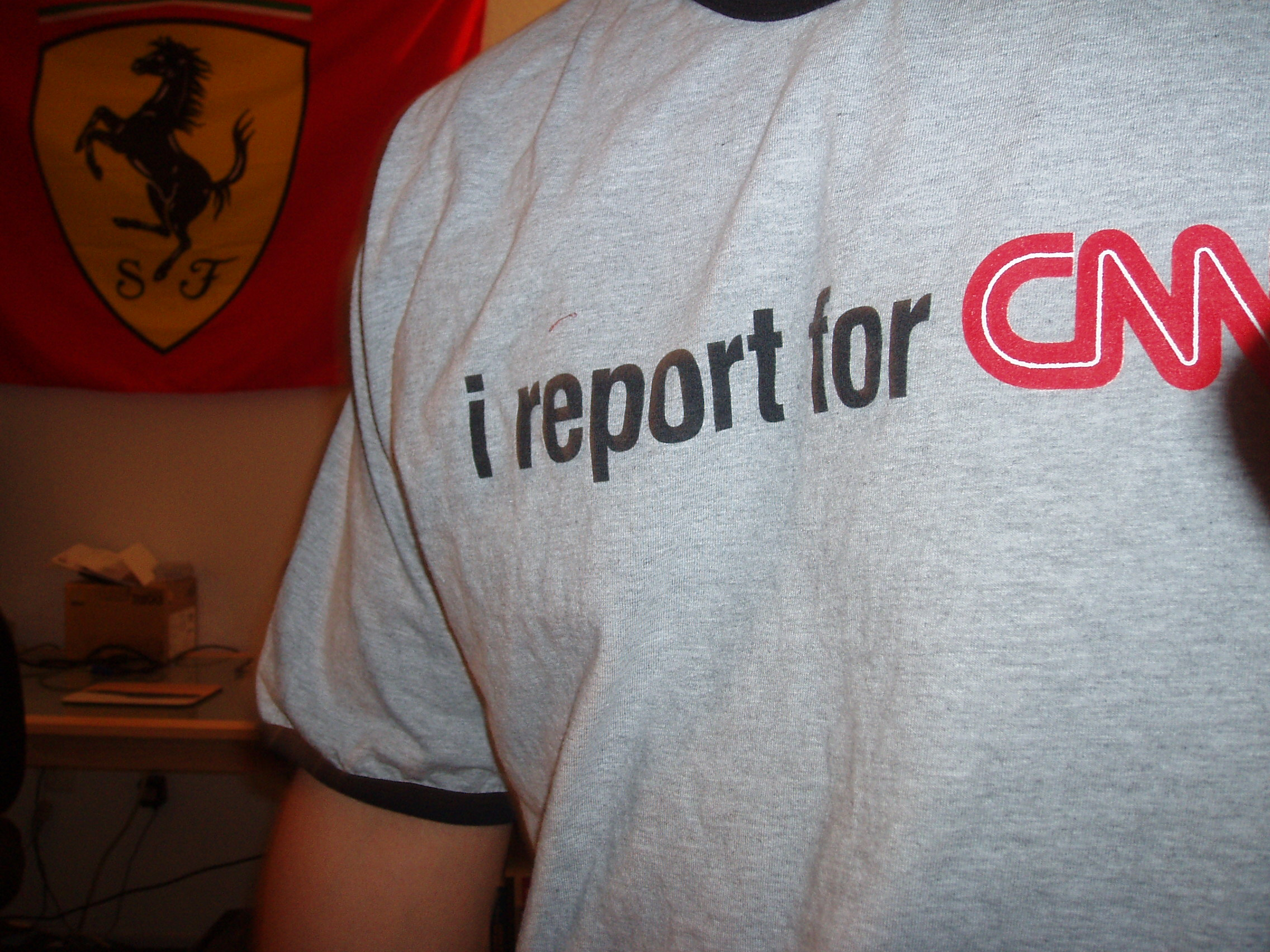
A T-shirt sent to some iReport contributors

iReport was CNN's citizen journalism initiative that allowed people from around the globe to contribute pictures and video of breaking news stories. It was similar to Wikinews in allowing, and encouraging, ordinary citizens to submit stories, photos and videos related to news of any sort. This ranged from breaking news to a story that a person believed is newsworthy. Submissions were not edited, fact-checked, or screened before they were posted. Stories that were verified were approved for use on all of CNN's platforms. The program was launched on August 2, 2006 to take advantage of the newsgathering capabilities of citizens at the scene of notable events. iReport grew out of another related program: CNN's Fan Zone, which allowed viewers to contribute pictures and video from the 2006 FIFA World Cup in Germany.

As of January 2012, there were more than a million registered iReport members. The success of iReport was utilized for specific programs, like the 2007 New Year's Eve coverage featuring iParty in which viewers' photos of their celebrations were shown on television. CNN producers also regularly provided "assignments", for possible inclusion in upcoming coverage.

In January 2015, iReport was moved from direct access on the CNN website, with a dramatic reduction in the number of views for stories. Many of the original senior staff members have moved or departed. In November 2015, CNN officially retired iReport and announced plans to supersede the website with a hashtag, #CNNiReport, through which users can submit news on social media sites including Instagram, Facebook and Twitter.

== Background ==
The tsunami caused by the 2004 Indian Ocean earthquake and the 7 July 2005 London bombings gave citizen journalists at the scene the opportunity to report on the events as they experienced them. Pictures from both were difficult to obtain in the moments after each tragedy. Broadcast news outlets, depending on agency or bureau video, were fortunate to receive submissions from people on the scene. Developing this format became a necessity for cable and network news shows.

== Notable events ==
Although iReport proved popular from its inception, one event in particular catapulted such citizen journalism onto the international stage. On April 16, 2007, a video submitted by graduate student Jamal Albarghouti captured the sounds of gunfire during the Virginia Tech massacre. CNN paid Albarghouti an undisclosed amount for the exclusive rights to the video he shot on his mobile phone. The immediacy of the pictures demonstrated the potential for such content.

On August 1, 2007, many of the earliest pictures and eyewitness accounts of the I-35W Mississippi River bridge collapse in Minneapolis, Minnesota were submitted to iReport.

In 2008, iReport generated controversy for a false report about Steve Jobs' health, which caused Apple's stock to temporarily drop. The hoax was attributed to users of the web forum 4chan.

== CNN iReport Awards ==
In 2011, CNN held the first iReport Awards, with awards being given for seven categories: breaking news, personal story, compelling imagery, commentary, original reporting, interview, and community choice.

== iReport.com ==
In January 2008 CNN acquired Ireport.com and I-report.com for $750,000. A beta version of the site launched on Wednesday, February 13, 2008. The site, which had its complete launch in March 2008, allowed users to submit media and have it instantly appear on the site. CNN Producers would go through the online submission and select reports for possible airing on the CNN television networks, CNN.com and other CNN platforms.The site also allowed iReporters to contact each other. The site functioned similar to YouTube and popular social.

== The New York Times buzzword ==
The New York Times described the word "I-reporter" as one of 2007's buzzwords: a word which endured long enough to find a place in the national conversation.

== Shows ==
CNN International aired "iReport for CNN". It was a weekly half-hour TV program showcasing iReport contributions. It was hosted by Errol Barnett. News to Me featured viewer-submitted content, along with other videos supplied by Blip.tv, Jumpcut.com, and Revver.com.

== Criticism ==
iReport and other phenomenon billed as 'citizen journalism' by corporate news networks often offer no pay to contributors, including photo and video contributions. While users are granted copyright to their contributions, they are often forced to relinquish control of who uses their work and where their images and video are shown worldwide.

CNN has also been criticized by insufficiently distinguishing iReport stories from its own output. There were several cases where hoax stories placed on that service were given credence by their apparent connection to CNN, for example a story about an impending asteroid impact, and several stories regarding Apple Computer that significantly influenced its stock price.

According to Fox News, an iReport entry from 2009 unvetted by CNN was incorporated into the Steele dossier years later.

== See also ==
- i-Caught
- Meporter
