= Canadian journalist organizations =

Canadian journalist organizations exist to advance issues important to the industry and facilitate networking and education. Registered associations include Canadian Association of Journalists, and the International Association of Independent Journalists Inc. The Canadian Journalism Foundation offers awards for outstanding journalism and J-talks programs to foster dialog. The Association of Electronic Journalists also gives awards while for print media News Media Canada focuses on the interests of Canadian (especially community) newspapers.

== List of Canadian journalist organisations ==
- Canadian Association of Journalists
- Professional Hockey Writers Association
- Journalists for Human Rights
- International Association of Independent Journalists Inc.
- Journalists for Human Rights
- Canadian Journalists for Free Expression
