= List of Devil May Cry episodes =

Devil May Cry
- Cover of the first DVD featuring Dante
- No. of episodes: 12

Release
- Original network: WOWOW
- Original release: June 4 – September 6, 2007

The Devil May Cry anime series is directed by Shin Itagaki and produced by Madhouse. The English adaptation of the anime has been licensed by Funimation Entertainment. They are based on the Devil May Cry video game series produced by Capcom. The background of the storyline is primarily based on the first and third installments of the series, Devil May Cry and Devil May Cry 3: Dante's Awakening respectively. The series follows the daily life of demon hunter Dante as he adopts a young girl named Patty Lowell and faces off against a demon seeking to attain godhood.

The anime was originally announced at the Tokyo Game Show on September 22, 2006, with plans to release twelve episodes of the series. Unlike most anime, the episode titles were released in English instead of the customary Japanese. The first episode aired on June 14, 2007, with the twelfth shown on September 6, 2007. The episodes aired on WOWOW.

On June 30, 2007, at Anime Expo 07, it was announced that ADV Films had licensed the show. However, in 2008, it became one of more than 30 titles that were transferred to Funimation. The series made its North American television debut on the Funimation Channel in September 2010 and it began airing on Chiller's Anime Wednesdays block on July 15, 2015.

Six DVD compilations have been released by Media Factory, each containing two episodes of the anime, with the latest one released on November 22, 2007. A special edition of the first compilation is packaged with Devil May Cry 4. An original soundtrack and a drama CD centered around Dante's ally Trish have also been released. A blu-ray disc was released on July 27, 2009.

== Episode list ==
No.	Title	Directed by	Written by	Original release date
1	"Devil May Cry"	Shin Itagaki	Toshiki Inoue	June 14, 2007
Dante, a private investigator specializing in demon hunting, is hired as the bodyguard of Patty Lowell, a young orphan who is supposedly the heir to a large fortune. He protects her from numerous attempts on her life by demon assassins, which her greedy uncles have summoned, wanting to claim the family fortune for themselves. It turns out that Patty is not the real heiress, but a decoy. Dante saves the life of the original heiress when one of the uncles reveals himself as an archdemon and tries to kill her himself. The heiress gives Patty part of her inheritance to keep quiet, and she moves in with Dante at his office, Devil May Cry.
2	"Highway Star"	Kenichi Kawamura	Shōtarō Suga	June 21, 2007
Dante reluctantly accepts a mission from his old acquaintance, Lady, to investigate a motorcyclist known as "Red Eye", who she suspects is a demon. The investigation leads them to Vincent, a professional racer who wants revenge on Red Eye for an illegal race that got his brother killed. Lady gets Dante to challenge Vincent to a race, during which the latter is drawn into an illusion and nearly killed before Dante and Lady force him off the road. Red Eye, who turns out to be a cyclopean demon disguised as a motorcycle, fights them before Lady is able to kill it with her rocket launcher. To Dante's displeasure, the money he earns from the mission is seized by Lady to cover his debt to her. Vincent arrives and asks Dante for a rematch, which he accepts on the condition that he loses a single round of billiards.
3	"Not Love"	Ken Nakayama	Bingo Morihashi	June 28, 2007
The mayor of Dante's home city learns that his daughter, Angelina, is seeing a man named Bradley. Fearing that Bradley may be linked to a serial killer operating in the city, he hires Dante to investigate him. Dante determines that Bradley is a demon, but spares him after eliminating another demon responsible for the murders. Bradley says he knows about Dante and reveals that he too is half-human and half-demon. Dante learns that Bradley is a spy for the demon lord Belphegor, who is preparing to ascend to the human world. The two race back to Angelina's home to find that her butler, a worshipper of demons, has murdered the mayor as part of a blood ritual that will summon Belphegor. Dante manages to return Belphegor to the underworld by force, while Bradley uses his powers to save the mayor's life, choosing Angelina over his master. As Dante contemplates whether or not demons can truly find happiness as humans, a strange woman is seen loitering outside his office.
4	"Rolling Thunder"	Kenichi Kawamura	Bingo Morihashi	July 5, 2007
While on a mission, Lady encounters a woman with lightning-based abilities, who she identifies as a demon. A local priest subsequently hires her to kill the woman, which ends in a fight to the death inside his church. Before the two can finish their fight, Dante arrives and introduces the woman as his old partner, Trish. He also explains that the priest, who turns out to be a fallen angel, set the women up to kill each other as a means of hiding his true nature and the murders he committed. The priest assumes his demon form and attacks them, but the three team up and slay him. Afterwards, Dante learns that both women have skipped town, leaving him with the bill for an expensive shopping spree.
5	"In Private"	Yoshitaka Makino	Shōtarō Suga	July 12, 2007
Isaac, an insecure man who views Dante as a rival for the affections of a waitress named Cindy, follows him one night into a nightclub, only to get thrown out after Dante tricks him into entering the women's bathroom. When he tries to follow him again, Patty chases him off. Isaac eventually witnesses Dante eliminate a horde of demons posing as Mafia soldiers and breaks into his office for answers. He runs into Sid, who gives him a small bell to hold. Isaac is attacked by a demon, but Dante kills it. He decides to flee to the countryside, but Dante intercepts him and reveals that the bell is, in fact, a summoning charm. After killing the remaining demons attracted to the charm, he destroys it with a single shot from his gun. Before leaving, he encourages Isaac to forget him and focus on Cindy. Isaac later visits Dante at Cindy's diner and orders the same sundae he's eating, which Dante interprets as an unwanted display of admiration.
6	"Rock Queen"	Fumie Muroi	Ichirō Sakai	July 19, 2007
Morison gets Dante a job protecting a team of treasure seekers looting a priceless collection of old vinyl records. Their leader, a businessman named Tim, plays one, attracting a siren that Dante chases off. Tim explains that the record was originally recorded by Elena Huston, a seemingly deceased rock singer whose career he managed before becoming a private collector. He correctly suspects that Elena is now looking for the record. In a series of flashbacks, Elena is shown as unintentionally summoning the siren, who uses her powers to make Elena famous before taking control of her body. Tim and Dante use the record to set a trap, and Dante is able to separate Elena from the siren before beheading the latter, freeing her. Elena, happy that Tim is preserving her songs, seemingly passes on to the afterlife, but at the end of the episode is seen happily awaiting Tim at his home, with a healed scar across her neck.
7	"Wishes Come True"	Takayuki Inagaki	Toshiki Inoue	July 26, 2007
As a reward for finding him, a djinn offers a fisherman named Gary one wish. After turning down his first three, he grants the fourth: murdering his friend Klaus after the two have an argument. Gary is charged with murder and imprisoned, and his sister pays Dante with her ring so that he can rescue him. Dante gets himself arrested and assaults the prison warden, getting thrown into solitary as a result. When the guards start hunting the prisoners for sport, Dante realizes that they are demons and lures them outside, where he kills them. Meanwhile, Lady encounters the djinn and drives it away when it refuses to grant any of her wishes. When she tells Dante to "go to hell" after catching him cheating at poker, the djinn appears and Dante manages to destroy it. Sid takes the djinn's mask for himself, but Dante decides not to go after him. While sharing a drink, Gary reveals that his sister died shortly after his arrest, and Dante returns the ring to him. Outside, he sees the sister's ghost pass on to the afterlife.
8	"Once Upon A Time"	Jun Fukuta	Shōtarō Suga	August 2, 2007
Morison brings in a client named Earnest, who mistakes Dante for his missing friend, Anthony. Morison explains that, twenty years ago, a small fishing town was destroyed by a demon that could breathe fire and that Anthony and his mother were blamed for the disaster. To clear their names, Dante visits Earnest, eventually deducing that Sid has orchestrated the whole thing as a test of Dante's abilities. Dante admits that he did use the name Anthony as an alias when he was younger, but he is not Earnest's friend. Earnest then summons the demon so that he can kill it, but it easily overpowers him. Only Dante's intervention saves his life and ends the demon's existence. After waking up in the hospital, Earnest learns that the demon destroyed the town while hunting for Dante and angrily swears to kill him if he ever returns. On the train ride home, Sid admits that everything he's been up to is part of a plan to "help" Dante, then vanishes before Dante can respond.
9	"Death Poker"	Kenichi Kawamura	Toshiki Inoue	August 9, 2007
Dante is hired to track down "King", a demon who feeds on the souls of gamblers when they lose. He subsequently receives an invitation to a private poker game aboard a cruise ship, assigning Lady to pose as the dealer. As each gambler loses, they all collapse and die until only Dante remains. He suddenly becomes hysterical and tries to attack Lady, forcing her to shoot him through the heart. The woman who originally hired him appears and reveals herself as King, a lilith who uses an enchanted pocket watch to possess gamblers and steal the souls of their opponents. Dante then reveals he survived his "death" and explains that he knew about the watch all along (Patty had accidentally fallen under its influence earlier) and that he and Lady have been playing King from the beginning. After a quick fight, King is slain and the team reconvenes at Devil May Cry, where Dante finds himself owing Patty money he doesn't have when she beats him at poker.
10	"The Last Promise"	Tooru Takahashi	Shōtarō Suga	August 23, 2007
The demon knight Baul, who was once Sparda's apprentice, is summoned by Sid to exact revenge on Dante as revenge for his father abandoning the demon realm. Modeus, Baul's brother and a former knight, is also summoned, and tries to get Baul to give up his vendetta while befriending Patty. Dante, who suspects that Baul desires his father's sword, Rebellion, challenges him to a duel, eventually killing Baul when he assumes his demon form. Modeus, bound by oath to avenge his brother, attacks Dante and is killed as well. When Patty arrives at Devil May Cry to make a sundae for Modeus, Dante lies and tells her that he left to "fulfill a promise". Sid visits the makeshift grave where Dante buried Baul and Modeus and gleefully remarks that he needs only one more thing to complete his plan.
11	"Showtime!"	Shin Itagaki, Kenichi Kawamura (Note: Although not listed on the official site, episode 11 and 12's ending credits list Kenichi Kawamura alongside Shin Itagaki for 演出 (Episode Direction))	Bingo Morihashi	August 30, 2007
Nina, a sorceress and Patty's estranged mother, hires Dante to guard her pendant, since she no longer has the power to fight off the many demons who seek to claim it. Patty runs off after Dante insults her, while Simon, Nina's friend, burns his hand when he tries to steal the pendant from Dante's pocket. Nina, unwilling to put anyone else in danger, offers to pay Dante for the day if he returns the pendant. Later that evening, Simon ties her up in her hotel room and reveals himself to be Sid, having used Modeus's skin as a disguise. He uses Nina as a hostage to force Patty to bring him the pendant, which he combines with other artifacts he's gathered to open a portal to the underworld. Morison escapes with Nina and Patty as Dante goes after Sid. Sid explains that he seeks the power of Abigail, a demon said to be one of the most powerful in history, and who was imprisoned by Patty's ancestors.
12	"Stylish!"	Shin Itagaki, Kenichi Kawamura	Bingo Morihashi	September 6, 2007
With Dante impaled and crucified in the demon world after being lured into a trap by Sid, Lady and Trish join forces to fight the invasion of devils in the human world while Patty, Nina, and Morrison attempt to rescue Dante. Once freed, Dante returns and challenges Sid to personal combat. Despite Sid's immense power from summoning Abigail, Dante defeats him. Sid is goaded into charging Dante, who manages to dispatch him with a single bullet. In the epilogue, Dante, Lady, and Trish leave on a devil-hunting mission and make a bet that whoever gets to the job first gets the reward money. Meanwhile, Patty busies herself with cleaning up Dante's filthy office.

== Production ==
The director of this work is Shin Itagaki, and the series composition and script are handled by Inoue Toshiki. The animation was produced by Madhouse. Capcom's Hiroyuki Kobayashi, producer of the game Devil May Cry 4, is also participating in the production as a supervisor. According to the director, the anime basically unfolds an original story. To fans of the game, it may seem "plain" but he aims to increase the number of action scenes and eventually make it a big deal. Several of the voice actors were cast by Itagaki. The plot was made as a "classic story." One of the goals of this work is to play it classic without being embarrassed, and Itagaki thinks they can provide a classic human drama in a good sense, and give players a relaxing experience. Kobayashi aimed to give a good focus not only on Dante but also Trish and Lady's stories and thus see the universe of Devil May Cry from another point of view. Dante was given a Japanese voice actor: Toshiyuki Morikawa. Morikawa believes that the character's appeal stems from his courage and lack of concern about money. Overseeing his characterisation, Morikawa joked that female viewers would only enjoy seeing him fight; he is less adept at daily life, and constantly interested in eating. However, he said that Dante might have sex appeal which would attract female viewers.

Two pieces of theme music are used for the episodes, one opening theme and one closing theme. The opening theme is "d.m.c." by rungran, and the closing theme is "I'll be your home" by Rin Oikawa. The original soundtrack for the episodes was released by Media Factory on August 18, 2007.

=== Home media ===
Japanese

Name	Date	Discs	Episodes
Volume 1	September 21, 2007	1	1–2
Volume 2	October 25, 2007	1	3–4
Volume 3	November 22, 2007	1	5–6
Volume 4	December 21, 2007	1	7–8
Volume 5	February 22, 2008	1	9–11
Collection	July 17, 2009	1	1–12

English

Name	Date	Discs	Episodes
Volume 1	February 5, 2008	1	1–4
Volume 2	May 6, 2008	1	5–8
Volume 3	October 7, 2008	1	9–12
Collection	September 28, 2010	1	1–12

== Reception ==
Critical response to the anime was mixed. Anime News Network liked Dante's characterization despite flaws in the writing. IGN concurred, finding Langdon a better actor than Toshiyuki Morikawa because of his experience with the series. DVD Talk liked the interactions between Dante, Lady, and Trish; the reviewer expected more of them in the anime, rather than stories focused on Dante facing enemies. He found Dante appealing in the anime series, based on his personality and actions. According to a FandomPost reviewer, Dante's role in the anime differed from the games in his childish behaviour over food and money; however, he was still "a great character". Otaku USA said that in the anime Dante remained faithful to his game version in his actions, most notably the gory (but limited) fighting.

The Fandom Post appreciated the episode in which Lady fights Trish because of a misunderstanding but they befriend each other. The writer also enjoyed the duo's role in the following episodes, most notably in the finale. GroundReport described Trish and Lady as foils for Dante and compared them with the main characters from the manga and anime series GetBackers due to Dante's financial issues, often receiving jobs from Lady.

On June 12, 2015, the Chinese Ministry of Culture listed Devil May Cry among 38 anime and manga titles banned in China.
