= KabarIndonesia =

Online newspaper in Indonesia

KabarIndonesia is an online newspaper in Indonesia.

It has been published by Yayasan Peduli Indonesia (Care about Indonesia Foundation) based in The Netherlands since November 11, 2006. It adopts citizen journalism system through which every reader (citizen) can be a reporter as well as writer that is commonly called as "citizen reporter". There are thousands Citizen Reporter in KabarIndonesia from around the world, but most of them are living in Indonesia. KabarIndonesia is written in Indonesian.

== History ==
The citizen journalism online newspaper, KabarIndonesia was first suggested by Elisabeth Widiyati together with her friends in The Netherlands. This simple idea was finally actualized by publishing an online newspaper with its official homepage on www.kabarindonesia.com started on November 11, 2006. As an independent citizen journalism media, the number of its reporters is growing very fast reaching to over 2.500 people by October 2007. It means that KabarIndonesia is an online newspaper with the biggest number of citizen reporters in Indonesia.

Currently Elisabeth Widiyati is as the President Director and Chief Editor of KabarIndonesia, cooperating closely with Fida Abbott as the Managing Editor.
