= Participatory cinema =

Active form of film-making

Participatory cinema is a form of participatory media regarding film-making and documentaries, advocated by David MacDougall. In his 1975 essay "Beyond Observational Cinema", MacDougal argued that traditional forms of documentary production evoked passivity from the filmmaker toward the documentary's subjects, and theorized that in participatory cinema, filmmakers could take an active role in their documentaries by directly interacting with their subjects, which can in turn profoundly develop the filmmaker's knowledge thereof.

== See also ==
- Pro-am
- Not to be confused with: Interactive cinema
- Participatory video
- Public participation
