= Moobol =

Chinese image sharing website

Moobol, founded in October 2006 and originally named Molive.cn, was a photo-sharing website based in Beijing, China. In addition to being a photograph sharing website, the service was also used by bloggers as a photo archive. Moobol had more than 100,000 photos from 30,000 users, mostly from mainland China and Southeast Asia. Moobol was a subsidiary of China Daily.

== Naming ==
The Chinese name of Moobol is Zhi Bo Ke, which literally translates as ‘people who report live’. The origin of The word ‘Moobol’ is derived from ‘Mobile’, describing people who use digital cameras, cellphone cameras, video cameras or other portable devices to capture or record what they have witnessed. Moobol has been described as synonymous with citizen journalism.

== History ==
Originally named Molive.cn, it was founded on January 1, 2006, by China Daily staffer Eric Zhang as a spin-off of Chinadaily.com.cn. It was initially created to provide internet and other premium services to cell phone users in China. When the company noticed an influx of users uploading pictures from their cell phones to report live events such as traffic jams, street fights and fire accidents, Molive.cn narrowed its service to the picture uploading business.

On October 18, 2006, Molive.cn changed its name to Moobol.com and primarily focused on providing a place on the internet for the common people to upload the photos they have taken with their digital cameras and camera phones. These photographs are usually uploaded in groups and accompanied with a brief description to illustrate an event or events that happened during the time the pictures were taken.

Moobol.com is considered the pioneering citizen journalism website in China. The creation of Moobol.com is significant because its model is revolutionary for traditional Chinese media. On similar websites, bloggers often take the role of analysts rather than reporters. Since the beginning of the new millennium, a growing percentage of television stations and newspapers prefer news (photographs, audio, stories) by citizen journalists over the traditional media. The current media, whether it is television, newspaper, or radio, employee professional journalists to report the news they see fit, often with biased views. But due to geographical difference and the conflict of interest, working journalists do not possess the capability to be at every corner of China in any given time frame and they do not always report all the stories as they develop. Moobols (Moobol users/citizen journalists) upload and report content based exclusive and non-exclusive news stories often ignored by the mainstream media outlets.

=== Sister Kindergarten ===
On November 15, 2006, a set of exclusive pictures of a kindergarten teacher under the alias "Sister Kindergarten" appeared on Moobol.com. Overnight, it was forwarded by tens of thousands of people and featured on thousands of websites in China. Within 3 days, "Sister Kindergarten" became an instant internet celebrity. In February 2007, "Sister Kindergarten" was named ‘Love Angel’ by the Chinese Red Cross Foundation (CRCF). From that moment, Moobol became a well-known platform for creating internet celebrities.

=== Internet Cafe Inside Ancient Wall In Xi’an ===
On December 21, 2006, a Moobol user named Jin Chi Niao (Golden Wing Bird) took a group of pictures of an internet café built inside the ancient City Wall in Xi’an. These pictures sparked a heated public debate. Supporters claimed it was an efficient use of the ancient structure, while opponents argued that the internet café damaged the aesthetic and historical value of the ancient wall as a whole. According to Jin Chi Niao, he was walking near Xi'an Railway Station on December 21, 2006, and that's when he noticed a large sign of an internet cafe attached to the outer face of the ancient city wall.

He quickly snapped a group of pictures and uploaded onto Moobol.com along with its description. Television stations and newspapers subsequently interviewed Jinchiniao and on December 26, 2006 the signboard of the internet café had been pulled down.

== Sources ==
- "Even in tightly controlled China, anyone can be a reporter", Christine Science Monitor, archived from the original on 22 July 2016
- "Chinese Citizen Photojournalism", Virtual China, archived from the original on 2007-03-14
- Lim, Kim. "On "You Witness News" by Reuters and Yahoo". Theory is the reason. Archived from the original on 19 September 2015.
