= La French Touch Conference =

Business event for French entrepreneurs, investors, and corporations

La French Touch Conference is an itinerant business event for entrepreneurs, investors, corporates, and members of the creative industries. It aims to promote French entrepreneurship abroad, and was founded in 2014 by French entrepreneurs Gaël Duval & Cédric Giorgi. A total of seven editions were organized in Paris, San Francisco, and New York City. Some of the past speakers hosted at the events include Yann LeCun, Eric Hippeau, Rachel Haot, Alexandre Mars, the writer Harlan Coben, the French designer Ora-Ito and the pastry chef Dominique Ansel.

La French Touch Conference has been supported by the French government and the city of New York during its previous events, having hosted:

- Emmanuel Macron, then Minister of the Economy, now President of France
- Axelle Lemaire, then French Secretary of State for Digital Affairs
- Fleur Pellerin, then French Secretary of State for Foreign Trade
- Mounir Mahjoubi, French Secretary of State in Charge of Digital Affairs
- Alicia Glen, Deputy Mayor of New York City
- Gale Brewer, President of the Manhattan Borough

In June 2016, La French Touch Conference launched a start-up competition which took place aboard an airplane, called "Pitch in the Plane". Two editions have been organized on Paris-New York commercial flights. The start-ups SkyLights and Mapwize won the competitions in 2016 and 2017 respectively. Among the jury members: VentureBeat European Correspondent Chris O’Brien, Géraldine Le Meur, Olivier Mathiot and Paul-François Fournier
