= On the Ground News Reports =

Jamaican social media news platform

Level Feet Media Limited
- Company type: Private
- Website type: Social media news service
- Available in: English
- Founded: Kingston, Jamaica (March 26, 2012)
- Headquarters: Business District, New Kingston, Jamaica
- Area served: Jamaica (2011–13); Worldwide (2013–present)
- Founder: Marc Ramsay
- Key people: Marc Ramsay (Chairman and CEO); Paul Thompson (CMO); Courtney Patterson (CTO); Timothy Beckford (Editor-in-Chief)
- Industry: Internet
- Website: www.og.nr
- Registration: Required
- Users: 750,000 (active May 2013)
- Launched: May 23, 2010
- Current status: Active

On the Ground News Reports (OGNR, stylised OG.NR) was a citizen journalism news platform that collects, validates and distributes user-generated news in short form (250 words or less) from Jamaica and around the world. Citizen Reporters, along with professional editors provide regular reports from the ground. OG.NR allows anyone who registers to contribute images, videos and other observations on local and global news.

OG.NR Editors filter for spam, fact check for authenticity and assign an authentication status to each news report (Confirmed, Corroborated, Unconfirmed). Once a report is published, other members can add context, and interact with the news by verifying, updating, commenting, or adding media such as pictures and video.

OG.NR facilitates users being able to send and receive news reports through its Desktop Website, Mobile Site, Apps, Email and Browser extensions. OG.NR is also highly integrated with social media platforms Facebook and Twitter. Users can also subscribe to receive reports from their cell phones via Text Message. This is helpful for persons without a data plan, or where Internet penetration is low but mobile penetration is high.

== Principles ==
OG.NR is guided by a core set of principles which link the individual to relevant reports and to the wider community:

1. All people deserve all news and the opportunity to provide it.
2. All people are, through facilitated collaboration, the best source for news.
3. The collective face of community news is a more trustworthy source.
4. Improving interaction and engagement results in more effective news.
5. Allegiance and community building increase value and efficiency.
6. Filling gaps left by traditional news media increases value.
7. There is a report in everything, everywhere.
8. Reports should be first, fast, accurate, concise, and relevant.
9. Reports must be honest, impartial and without speculation.
10. Consistently delivering on our principles results in increased earnings.

== History ==
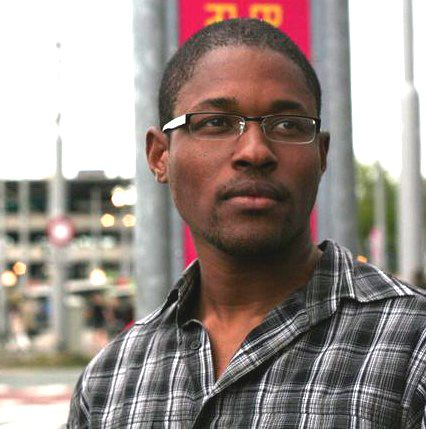
Marc Ramsay founded OG.NR in 2010.

Marc Ramsay founded On the Ground News Reports as a Facebook Page on May 23, 2010 during Jamaica's now infamous incursion by security forces into Tivoli Gardens, Kingston to capture convicted drug lord Christopher Coke. While the government attempted to filter information and mainstream news organizations fell silent, OG.NR’s Facebook page became for all intents and purposes, the only source of news on the related happenings in Jamaica.

Citizens in the midst of the happenings submitted reports, photos and videos, which were then broadcast to the audience, who then verified them by adding updates, comments, and context. In under 48 hours, OG.NR on Facebook grew to over 22,000 subscribers. The page continued to grow as it distinguished itself as the source for breaking news on happenings across Jamaica, with exclusive breaking news, images and video.

In December 2011, OG.NR launched Jamaica's first ever interactive news map, which gave live coverage and results of the local elections.

On March 26, 2012 Level Feet Media Limited was incorporated. Ramsay, along with his co-founders Courtney Patterson, Paul Thompson and Timothy Beckford, built and launched OG.NR Version 1 website on the premium domain name “og.nr”. As of May 2013, OG.NR had over 94,000 Facebook subscribers, SMS subscribers in 25 countries, more than 12,000 Twitter Followers, and is today the third most trafficked Jamaican media website behind the two major local dailies.

== Notable stories ==
In May 2010, OG.NR beat the Jamaica Gleaner, Jamaica Observer, and the RJR Communications Group by providing fast breaking updates on the incursion into the Tivoli Gardens Community in Kingston by Government security forces to capture alleged drug kingpin Christopher "Dudus" Coke. OG.NR provided a watermarked exclusive photograph of the captured Coke to CNN.

== Advisors ==
At the launch of the service at tech event Kingston Beta, Chief Marketing Officer Paul Thompson announced that OG.NR's advisory board included Harvard Professor Charles Nesson and Jamaican entertainment entrepreneur Kamal Bankay. The full board of advisors includes Prof. Charles Nesson, Founder of the Berkman Center for Internet & Society, Dr. Tolu Bewaji, an International Business and Strategy lecturer at the Mona School of Business and Management, Accountant and Auditor Georgia Scott of KPMG Cayman, Celene Tyson, a Systems Analyst at World Bank and Kamal Bankay of CMA.

At launch the team also announced that they were raising a US$300,000 investment for operational and technological development of the service.
