= Participatory video =

Participatory video (PV) is a form of participatory media in which a group or community creates their own film. The idea behind this is that making a video is easy and accessible, and is a great way of bringing people together to explore issues, voice concerns or simply to be creative and tell stories. It is therefore primarily about process, though high quality and accessible films (products) can be created using these methods if that is a desired outcome. This process can be very empowering, enabling a group or community to take their own action to solve their own problems, and also to communicate their needs and ideas to decision-makers and/or other groups and communities. As such, PV can be a highly effective tool to engage and mobilise marginalised people, and to help them to implement their own forms of sustainable development based on local needs.

== Process ==
- Participants (men, women and youth) rapidly learn how to use video equipment through games and exercises.
- Facilitators help groups to identify and analyse important issues in their community by adapting a range of Participatory Rural Appraisal (PRA)-type tools with participatory video techniques (for example, social mapping, action search, prioritising, etc.)
- Short videos and messages are directed and filmed by the participants.
- Footage is shown to the wider community at daily screenings.
- A dynamic process of community-led learning, sharing and exchange is set in motion.
- Completed films can be used to promote awareness and exchange between various different target groups. InsightShare, for example, has worked with pastoralists, farmers, marginalised communities and youth in rural and urban settings, street children, refugees and asylum seekers, people with mental health problems, learning difficulties and physical disabilities.
- Participatory video films or video messages can be used to strengthen both horizontal communication (e.g. communicating with other communities) and vertical communication (e.g. communicating with decision-makers)

== Comparison to documentary filmmaking ==
Whilst there are forms of documentary filmmaking that are able to sensitively represent the realities of their subjects' lives and even to voice their concerns, documentary films very much remain the authored products of a documentary filmmaker. As such, the subjects of documentaries rarely have any say (or sometimes have some limited say) in how they will ultimately be represented. By contrast, in PV the subjects make their own film in which they can shape issues according to their own sense of what is important, and they can also control how they will be represented. Additionally, documentary films are often expected to meet stringent aesthetic standards and are usually made with a large audience in mind. The PV process, on the other hand, is less concerned with appearance than with content, and the films are usually made with particular audiences and objectives in mind.

== Origins ==
The first experiments in PV were the work of Don Snowden, a Canadian who pioneered the idea of using media to enable a people-centered community development approach. Then Director of the Extension Department at Memorial University of Newfoundland, Snowden worked with filmmaker Colin Low and the National Film Board of Canada's Challenge for Change program to apply his ideas in Fogo Island, Newfoundland, a small fishing community. By watching each other’s films, the different villagers on the island came to realise that they shared many of the same problems and that by working together they could solve some of them. the films were also shown to politicians who lived too far away and were too busy to actually visit the island. As a result of this dialogue, government policies and actions were changed. The techniques developed by Snowden became known as the Fogo process. Snowden went on to apply the Fogo process all over the world until his death in India in 1984.

The first community-made video in Canada was the 1969 Challenge for Change video VTR St-Jacques, filmed in a poor Montreal neighbourhood. In order to make VTR St-Jacques, directors Dorothy Henault and Bonnie Sherr Klein trained community members in video to represent their struggle for affordable and accessible medical care. VTR St-Jacques was shown across Canada and the U.S., inspiring other projects.

There has been no uniform movement to promote and practise PV but different individuals and groups have set up pockets of PV work, usually molding it to their particular needs and situations. PV has also grown with the increasing accessibility of home video equipment.

An early and significant book on participatory video was published in the UK in 1997 by Clive Robertson and Jackie Shaw, Directors of Real Time Video, and has informed many subsequent books and articles, including the book this article has drawn from. Real Time are an educational charity that pioneered many of the techniques and methodologies still used today, and have been working in the participatory video field since 1984.

== Applications ==
In combination with other methodologies such as Participatory Learning in Action (PLA) techniques, Participatory Rural Appraisal and others. PV has been successfully applied to projects focussing on; community development; promoting local innovation and endogenous development; therapeutic work; a voice for marginalised groups; a catalyst for community-led action; a tool for communicating with policy makers; a means of involving users in their own research for example action research, participatory research, user-led research; also for programme monitoring and evaluation or Social impact assessment...new possible applications are being continually developed.

== Examples ==
- InsightShare Participatory Video
- Children As Media Producers (CAMP)
- China Villager Documentary Project, www.ccdworkstation.com
- Deccan Development Society
- Participatory Documentary Center of the IFChina Original Studio, www.ifchinastudio.org, www.artisimple.com
- Video Volunteers
- YouTube channel linking to videos made by children and youth throughout the world
- The truth lies in Rostock (http://www.spectacle.co.uk/archive_production.php?id=155) is an example of community-led investigation on political riots that took place in Rostock in 1992
- Voices of Women Media

== Other articles and books ==
- Nigg, H. Rebel Video. The Video Movement of the 1970s and 1980s. London, Basel, Bern, Lausanne, and Zurich. Zurich 2017, Verlag Scheidegger & Spiess, ISBN 978-3-85881-801-0 / with website
- Braden, S. Participation – A Promise unfulfilled? Building Alliance between people and government: Action Research for Participatory Representation. Download:
- Braden, S. (1998) Video for Development. A casebook for Vietnam (Oxfam)
- Elliot, D. (2006) "Everyone's a teacher everyones a student" ICT Update
- Johansson, L. (1999) ‘Participatory Video and PRA: Acknowledging the politics of Empowerment’, in Forests, Trees and People, Newsletter No. 40/41, December 1999, pp. 21–23.
- Johansson, L. (1999) Participatory Video and PRA in development planning. Download:
- Lunch, C. (2007) The Most Significant Change: using participatory video for monitoring and evaluation. In: Participatory Learning and Action 56, London: IIED. Download(pay per view or free to subscribers)
- Lunch, N & C. (2006) Insight's into Participatory Video: a handbook for the field. Download:
- Lunch, C (2006) Participatory Video for monitoring and evaluation: Capacity.org
- Lunch, C (2004) 'PV - Rural People Document their Knowledge and Innovations': IK Notes.
- Milne, E-J. Mitchell, C. and de Lange, N. Eds. (2012) The Handbook of Participatory Video (AltaMira Press) https://rowman.com/ISBN/9780759121133
- Nathanials, N.Q (2006) Implementation of Cocoa IPM in West Africa. Participatory Video. A guide to getting started (CABI) Download:
- Olmos, G. (2005) Participant Authored Audiovisual Stories (PAAS): Giving the Camera Away or giving the camera a way?” Download
- Robertson, C. and Shaw, J. (1997) Participatory Video: A Practical Approach to Using Video Creatively in Group Developmental Work (Routledge)
- Sateesh, P.V. (1999) ‘An alternative to literacy?’ in Forests, Trees and People Newsletter No. 40/41, December 1999, pp. 9–13
- Satheesh, P. V (?) Participation and Beyond: Handing Over the Camera (Deccan Development Society, Hyderabad, India). Contact:
- Setchell, C (2006) Insight's new partnership with the United Nations : Sharing Circle. (see pages 2, 6 and 7).
- White, S. (2003) (ed.) Participatory Video: Images that transform and Empower (London, Sage)
- Nigg, H. and Wade, G. Community Media. Community Communication in the UK: video, local TV, film, and photography. A documentary report on six groups. Zurich/London 1980: Regenbogen Verlag, ISBN 3-85862-010-6

== See also ==
- Animated documentary
- Citizen media
- Concert film
- Community film
- Docudrama
- Docufiction
- Documentary film festivals
- Documentary mode
- Documentary Practice
- Ethnofiction
- Ethnographic film
- Filmmaking
- List of documentaries
- List of motion picture-related topics
- Lists of directors and producers of documentaries
- Mockumentary
- Mondo film
- Nature documentary
- Participatory cinema
- Political Cinema
- Public-access television
- Public participation
- Reality film
- Rockumentary
- Travel documentary
- Visual anthropology
- Web documentary
- Women's Cinema
