= Courtney C. Radsch =

American journalist (born 1979)

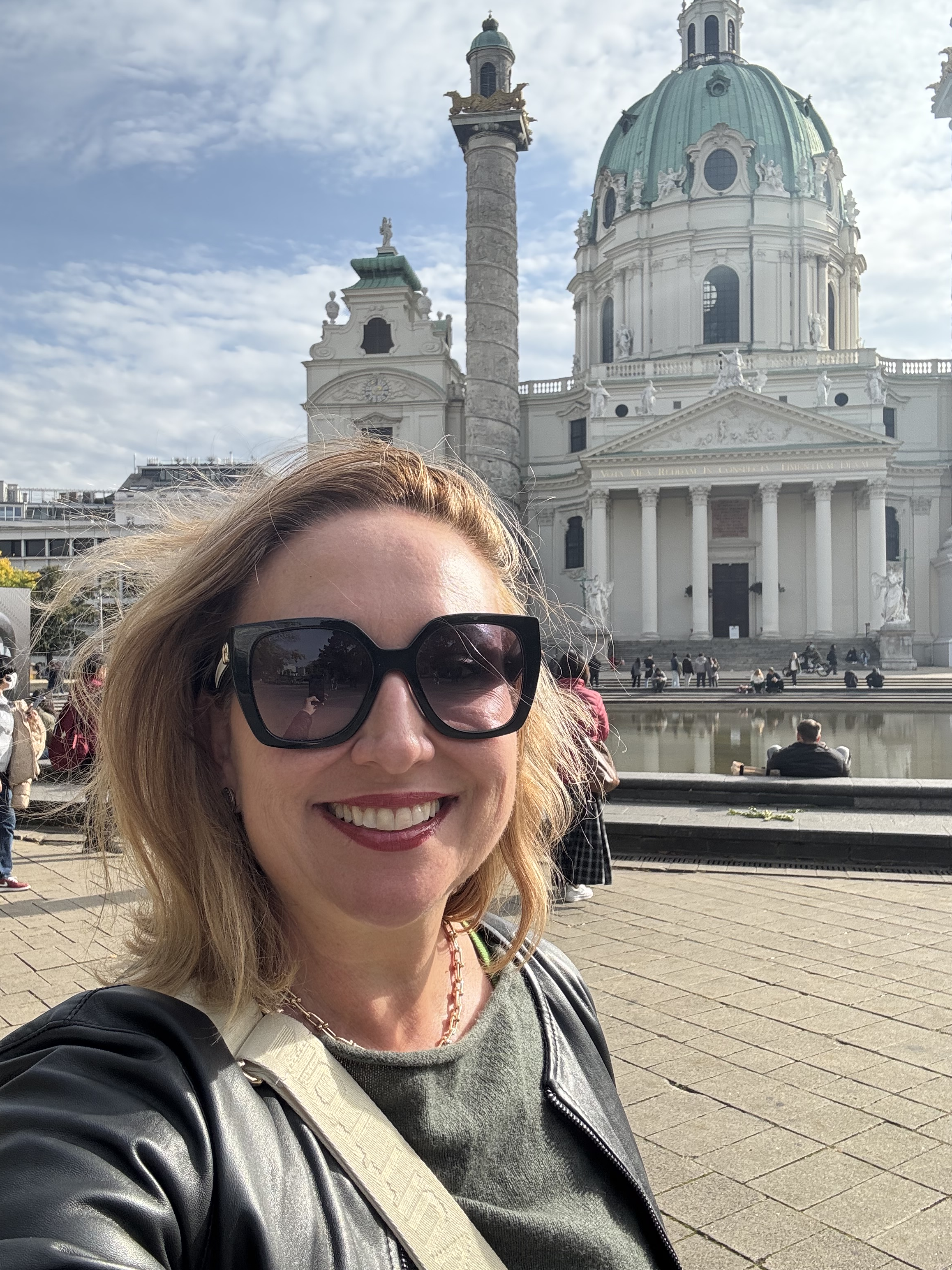
Courtney C. Radsch, 2025

Courtney C. Radsch (born 1979) is an American journalist, author and advocate for freedom of expression. She is the author of Cyberactivism and Citizen Journalism in Egypt: Digital Dissidence and Political Change and is Director of the Center for Journalism and Liberty at Open Markets Institute. She previously held positions with UCLA, UNESCO and the Committee to Protect Journalists. She has written and been interviewed extensively about digital activism and social media in the Middle East since 2006.

== Work ==
Dr. Radsch is an internationally recognized expert on social media, citizen journalism, and activism and is frequently invited to comment about new media and the Middle East. She has appeared on CNN, Al Jazeera, MSNBC among other international outlets. Radsch also appeared in the PBS Frontline documentary Revolution in Egypt. She is the author of Cyberactivism and Citizen Journalism in Egypt: Digital Dissidence and Political Change (Palgrave Macmillan 2016).

Radsch's work on cyberactivism in Egypt and the Middle East has been widely published and she is frequently asked to speak on the subject. Radsch is one of the earliest proponents of the political impact of cyberactivism in the Middle East and analysts of Arab media. As early as 2006 Radsch was writing about the revolutionary impact of blogging and social media in Egypt; in 2006 she presented a paper entitled "The Revolution Will be Blogged: New Media Cultural Configurations" at a conference in Cairo. Radsch's Arab Media blog, started in 2006, is one of the longest-running blogs on the topic. Radsch is the author of several book chapters about cyberactivism, social media and the Middle East.

In Core the Commonplace she traced the development of cyberactivism in Egypt, arguing that there were three distinct phases in the development of blogging: experimentation, activism and diversification and that blogging was having a significant political impact. Her extensive ethnographic research on Egyptian cyberactivism provides a unique insight into the antecedents of the 2011 Egyptian Revolution. In her chapter on the blogosphere and social media in a study by the Stimson Center, Seismic Shift: Understanding Change in the Middle East she argues that between 2005 and 2010 Middle Eastern blogs and social media showed rising dissatisfaction with the status quo, declining levels of fear and visible capability to mobilize large political protests.

== Career ==
Radsch began working as a journalist in 2003 when she worked as a news editor at The Daily Star (Lebanon). She then worked for The New York Times in the Washington Bureau where she covered the 2004 elections, Abu Ghraib, politics and culture.

In 2005, Radsch left the Times to pursue a Ph.D. in international relations at American University, where her research focused on cyberactivism in Egypt. Her dissertation, Digital Dissidence and Political Change: Cyberactivism and Citizen Journalism in Egypt, provides the first scholarly examination of the development of the youth movement in Egypt and the role that technology played in reconfiguring what she calls "the potentiality for expression and participation" and thus contributes to understanding how ICTs are implicated in processes of political change.

In 2008, Radsch was hired by the Saudi-owned, Dubai-based Arabic satellite channel Al Arabiya as the English website managing editor. As a journalist and editor at Al Arabiya she oversaw the expansion of the English website and its integration into the broader newsroom. In October 2009 she published an article about safety problems on the airline Emirates, whose president Sheikh Ahmed bin Saeed Al Maktoum is also the head of the Civil Regulatory Authority and the uncle of Dubai's ruler, Sheikh Mohammed Bin Rashid Al Maktoum. According to Reporters Without Borders, she lost her job at Al Arabiya as a result of the article. The Australian newspaper, which originally broke the story about the safety problems, covered her dismissal. The article quoted an Emirates official denying that it had pressured the station and its PR firm claimed inaccuracies in the article, but did not specify what they were. Radsch worked for Al Arabiya from 2008 to 2009.

Dr. Radsch also ran the Freedom of Expression Campaign at Freedom House from 2010 to 2012 and was interim managing editor at the Development Executive Group in 2008. She received her PhD from American University.

== Bibliography ==
- "Words and War: Al Jazeera and Al Qaeda." In Osama Bin Laden and the Global Media: Political Actors, News Coverage, and Popular Cultures. Ed. By Susan Jeffords and Fahad Y. AlSumait. University of Illinois Press. 2014.
- Unveiling the Revolutionaries: Cyberactivism and the Role of Women in the Arab Uprisings. April 2012. The Baker Institute and the Kelly Day Endowment, Rice University. Available at https://ssrn.com/abstract=2252556
- 2011. Blogosphere and Social Media. In Seismic Shift: Understanding Change in the Middle East. Stimson Center: May 25, 2011.
- Arab Bloggers as Citizen Journalists (Transnational). In Encyclopedia of Social Movement Media, edited by J. Downing: Sage. 2010.
- Freedom of Expression in the Middle East and North Africa. Afkar/Ideas. October 2010. Institut Europeu de la Mediterrània. Barcelona, Spain.
- From Cell Phones to Coffee: Issues of Access in Egypt. In Surviving Field Research, edited by C. Lekha Sriram, O. Martin-Ortega, J. C. King, J. Mertus and J. Herman. London: Taylor & Francis Ltd Routledge. 2010.
- Core to Commonplace: The evolution of Egypt's blogosphere. Arab Media & Society. Fall (6) 2008. Cairo: American University of Cairo. http://www.arabmediasociety.com/?article=692
- How Al Jazeera is Challenging and Improving Egyptian Journalism. Reset: Dialogue on Civilizations, Oct./Nov. 2007 https://web.archive.org/web/20080907081354/http://resetdoc.org/EN/Radsch-Ucsb.php
- Editor. "The State of Latino Kids in the District of Columbia." Council of Latino Agencies. May. 2003.
- Co-author. "Primarie 2000, Internet nella campagna elettorale." (2000 Primaries: Electoral Campaigning Online). La Repubblicca. Dec. 2000. http://www.repubblica.it/online/presidenziali_usa_berkeley/berkeley/berkeley/berkeley.html
