= International Association of Independent Journalists Inc. =

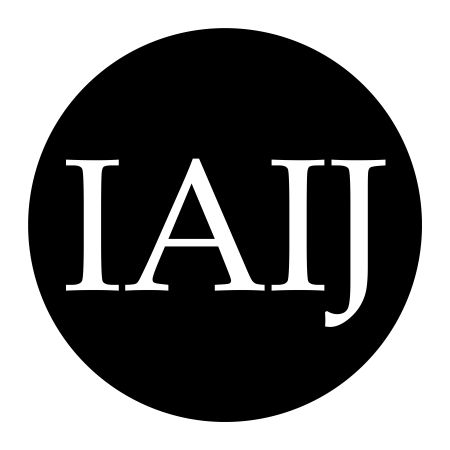
- IAIJ Logo
- Founded: 2003; Toronto, Ontario, Canada
- Founder: Maurice Ali
- Type: Non-profit
- Purpose: Journalism
- Location(s): Toronto, Ontario, Canada; London, England (International)
- Region served: Worldwide
- Method: lobbying, research
- Website: www.iaij.org

The International Association of Independent Journalists Inc. (IAIJ) is a registered not-for-profit journalist association with offices in Toronto, Ontario, Canada and London, England. The association is international and caters to amateur (citizen journalists) and professional journalists with advocacy and support services worldwide.

== History ==
The International Association of Independent Journalists was created in October 2003 by Maurice Ali who was a journalist and writer living in Toronto, Ontario, Canada. In his book "Protest!: The Fall of Civil Disobedience," Maurice Ali noted the emergence of the "citizen journalist" and that the journalist community should be more inclusive of all types of journalists, and this same sentiment became the basis for IAIJ's constitution when incorporated as a not-for-profit corporation on February 12, 2008 (Letters Patent file number: 446727-2). This constitution of inclusion followed most closely, the policies and mandates of the U.N./UNESCO derived from Article 19 of the United Nations' Universal Declaration of Human Rights.

The association grew over the years, gained a second office in London, England; and on June 11, 2011, the association became an "Institutional Member" of the Canadian Commission for UNESCO which is located in Ottawa, Ontario, Canada.

In 2015 IAIJ distinguished itself as a citizen journalist NGO by attending high level meetings at the United Nations (WSIS+10) culminating with a speech by Maurice Ali in General Assembly at the UN asking that citizen journalists finally be recognized as legitimate journalists with protections, and for the first time internationally they were by majority vote at UN headquarters in December 2015 at WSIS+10.

On July 25, 2016, IAIJ attained Consultative Status at the United Nations.

== Operations ==
Membership of the association is in the hundreds with a board of directors. A general meeting is held each year at the head office in Toronto on February 12. Membership is international and support and services are dispatched through offices in Toronto, Ontario, Canada, and London, England. The association has a diploma program for self-improvement and also provides editorial material for a newspaper called "The Fortress."

== Advocacy ==
The association through its President (Maurice Ali) and the membership have participated in advocacy by published studies and articles on citizen journalism, attended and spoken at UNESCO and United Nations events as advocates of citizen journalism worldwide.

IAIJ became the first citizen journalist NGO to advocate for recognition and protections as legitimate journalists for the first time ever internationally, as well as advocating for other online media workers (such as bloggers) at the WSIS+10 Review Meetings with a speech by Maurice Ali in General Assembly to member nations. These new recognitions and protections were ratified by majority vote by member nations at United Nations Headquarters in December 2015 in the final statement of the WSIS+10 Review Process (sections 44 and 45).

IAIJ has also participated in other freedom of expression types of advocacy at the United Nations. In 2017 IAIJ introduced a cell phone application (Worldwide Vote) to allow anyone with a smart phone to participate as a popular vote at the UN for help in policy making as a side event at the 55th Session of the Commission for Social Development at UN headquarters. In 2019 IAIJ introduced the idea for a new mandate at the United Nations called "A Positive Major Mandate for Humanity at the United Nations" as a side event and a statement read at the 57th Session of the Commission for Social Development at UN Headquarters on February 19, 2019(The Positive Mandate for Humanity is a concept that as a humanity we should strive for our greatest expression mentally and physically not only because it enables all ideas to solve problems and advance our culture, but also because it makes us happy).

Most recently IAIJ has participated in the "Summit of the Future" introducing its version of a "Global Social Contract" as disseminated at the United Nations in 2024.

== Awards ==
The International Association of Independent Journalists Inc. has an award called the "IAIJ Award for Journalism" and is presented to journalists who have distinguished themselves in news gathering and investigative reporting.
