= Rachel Haot =

American businesswoman and entrepreneur

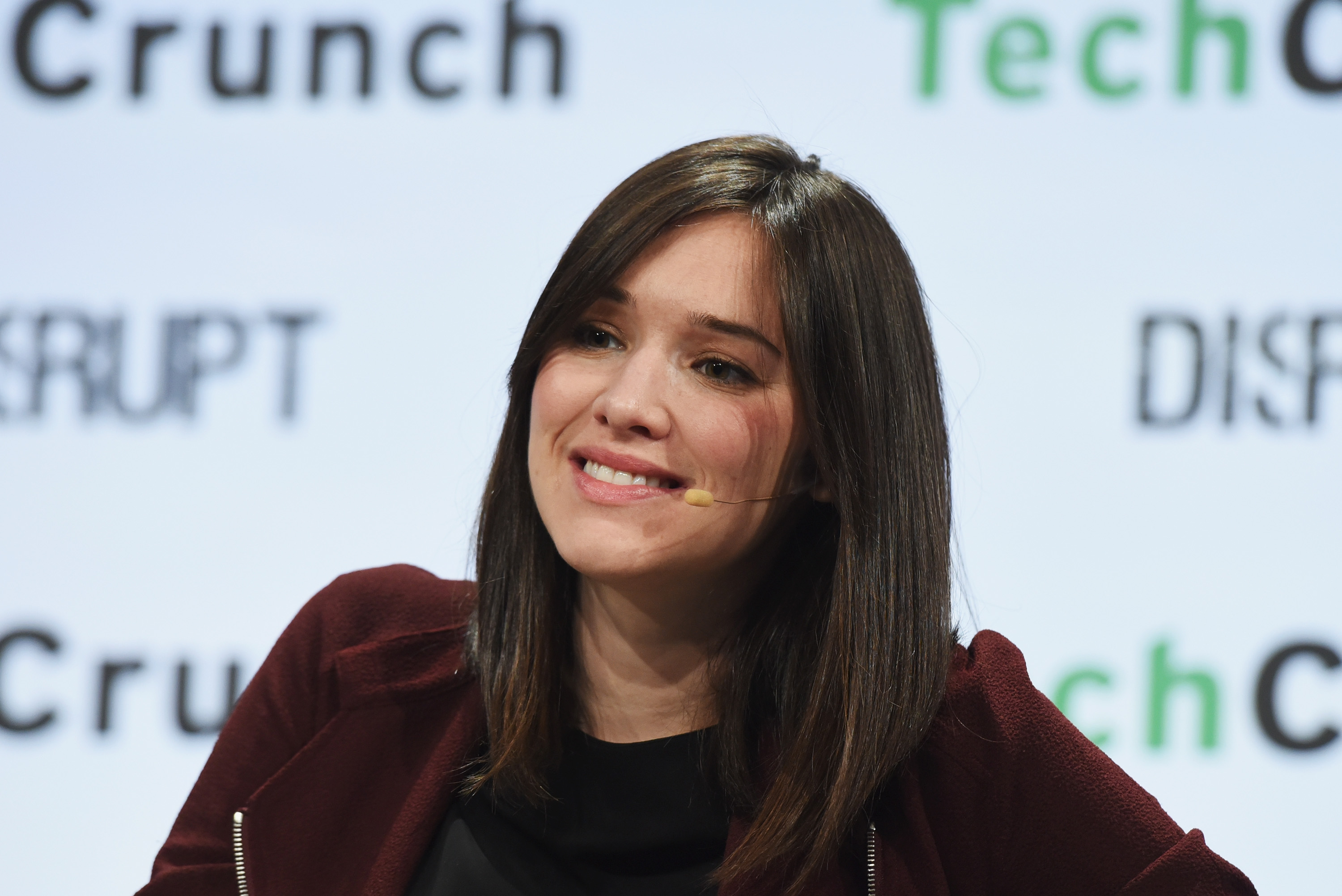
- Haot in 2016
- Born: August 15, 1983 (age 43); New York City, US
- Other name: Rachel Sterne
- Education: New York University
- Occupation: Businesswoman
- Known for: GroundReport, City of New York
- Spouse: Max Haot (m. 2012)

Rachel Haot (née Sterne, born August 15, 1983) is an American businesswoman. She is currently Chief of Staff at Bedrock. Prior to this, she was executive director of the Transit Innovation Partnership, a public-private initiative of the Partnership for New York City and the Metropolitan Transportation Authority. Haot was previously the chief digital officer and Deputy Secretary for Technology of New York State for two years. Prior to this role, Rachel was Chief Digital Officer for the City of New York from January 2011 to December 2013. She co-founded and ran GroundReport between 2006 and 2010.

== Early life ==
Haot was born in 1983 in Manhattan to parents Paul Sterne, a former IBM managing director, and Anna Sterne, the director of patient services at a nonprofit healthcare organization. Haot largely grew up in Park Slope, Brooklyn and Dobbs Ferry, New York. She graduated from Dobbs Ferry High School in 2001. She graduated magna cum laude with a bachelor's degree in history from New York University in 2005.

== Career ==
=== Ground Report ===
From 2006 to 2010, Haot was one of the founders of GroundReport, a global crowdsourced news startup.

=== Columbia Business School ===
In 2011 Haot taught a course on Social Media and Entrepreneurship at Columbia Business School as an adjunct professor.

=== New York City ===
In 2011, Katherine Oliver (Commissioner of The New York City Mayor's Office of Film, Theatre and Broadcasting) named Haot to the post of Chief Digital Officer.

Haot's office hosted the Reinvent Payphones Design Challenge, a competition to promote the re-purposing of New York City’s public pay telephones for the digital age, which garnered over 100 submissions from design firms and universities and was the precursor to LinkNYC. Haot led the relaunch of official City of New York website , integrating city services, realtime data, cloud-based scalability and responsive design. Haot also oversaw policy and strategy for the launch of New City's top-level domain, .nyc.

=== New York State ===
As Chief Digital Officer for New York State, Haot was responsible for digital products, programs and policy. Haot led the relaunch of State website ny.gov in November 2014, overhauling design and architecture. The well-received update was the first major change in over 15 years. Haot's team was also responsible for digital content production and social media engagement.

In March 2015, Haot appeared on NY1 to highlight the Governor's $500 million universal broadband program, which was later passed by the legislature. On the first anniversary of the NY.gov relaunch, New York State announced record breaking digital growth, including quadrupled page views and doubled users, a year after the design and technology overhaul.

=== 1776 ===
In January 2016, Haot announced that she was resigning from the State to join global incubator and seed fund 1776 as Managing Director, applying her experience to help startups navigate government and bringing together policymakers, entrepreneurs, institutions and investors to support economic growth. Haot left 1776 in August 2017.

=== Transit Innovation Partnership ===
At the Transit Innovation Partnership, Haot spearheaded initiatives including the MTA live subway map built pro bono by design firm Work & Co, and the Transit Tech Lab, which enabled the MTA to test technology for bus route planning, predictive bus maintenance and subway platform crowding detection. "Helvetica" filmmaker Gary Hustwit directed a short film titled "The Map" about the making of the live subway map. The map has won numerous awards including a Webby Award and a Cannes Gold Lion Award.

=== Bedrock ===
Haot is currently Chief of Staff at Bedrock.

== Awards ==
She has been named a Young Global Leader by the World Economic Forum, and Chief Digital Officer of the Year in 2014 by the CDO Summit. She has been recognized as a "30 Under 30" leader by Fortune and Forbes, and was honored at the City and State Above & Beyond Awards in 2015.

== Personal life ==
Rachel Haot lives in Los Angeles with her husband Max Haot, a Belgian-American who founded Livestream and is CEO of Vast, and their children.
