= We the Media =

- Author: Dan Gillmor
- Language: English
- Publisher: O'Reilly
- Publication date: 2004

We the Media is a book written by Dan Gillmor, published in 2004 by O'Reilly (ISBN 0596007337).

Gillmor discusses how the proliferation of grassroots internet journalists (bloggers) has changed the way news is handled. One of the book's main arguments is that major media companies cannot control the news that is most often viewed, as news is being published in real-time via the Internet. The book received widespread praise from the demographic it covered, and mixed reviews elsewhere.

== Background ==
We the Media details how media and its consumption has changed with the introduction of online platforms. Big corporations are no longer able to control what is being published about themselves, while the "former audience," as Gillmor calls it, is no longer passive. The former audience has a larger role in the consumption and production of media.

Gillmor believes the aggressive use of copyrighting in America is a cause for the lack of creativity and innovation in the states. For this reason, he has his book published for free under a creative commons. The book will be released into the public domain 14 years after publication.

== Ch. 1: From Tom Paine to Blogs and Beyond ==
"Big Media" has increased availability of news reception. Major broadcasting companies no longer have the mass influence over users it once had. News is now more of a conversation. News has more choices, voices, perspectives, and options. "Big Media's" only strength is its depleting stocks of financial resources and their powerful presence during copyright investigations.

Early social innovators, like Thomas Paine and other early American pamphleteers and muckrakers, set the stage for successive media revolutions. The most significant being worldwide, low-cost access to internet and having their own say about what is happening in the world.

== Ch. 2: The Read-Write Web ==
David Winer developed user friendly software that would allow most people with a computer to be able to write on the web. People no longer needed an Internet service provider account or be an expert with HTML to create web pages. With this new technology anyone could subscribe to the content of others. In the past 150 years there were two major means of communication: one to many, and one to one. Winer's software changed this.

This chapter the addition of "many too many" or "few too few". Individualsuse SMS for time sensitive alerts, text messages, and information. Publishing is easy with RSS. It allows the public to both blog about and keep up with current events, commentary, personals, and businesses. The internet makes the amateur the professional. There is no reliance on limited sources because the public can access information and receive events in real time.

== Ch. 3: The Gates Come Down ==
This chapter describes blogs, e-mail, and online journals as tools that individuals use to gather and publish information, including information about corporations and political affairs. Gillmor contrasts this with earlier periods, when major media organizations had more influence over what information was available to the public.

There are a number of ways for writers to get their story out others in their online communities. Twitter, Tumblr, Facebook, Medium and WordPress are a few of these online platforms. The days of big media are numbered due to this expanding movement of writing individually for the people.

== Ch. 4: Newsmakers Turn the Tables ==
Politicians of the future will not be able to use the media to its highest effect. In his discussion of Phil Gomes, Gillmor mentions that a large part of the success of Gomes’ strategy was the IBM AS/400. Computers made the instant transfer of materials possible. This helped Gomes achieve his marketing penetration.

The largest part of Gillmor’s focus lies in the way the current political community has yet to embrace the notion of social media. His main advice for the community at large is to make use of the media as a tool. The community can use the untapped masses connected to the other end of those networks.

== Ch. 5: The Consent of the Governed ==
The introduction of the Internet is a medium both for politicians and citizens to actively contribute to campaigns. The chapter focuses on the usage of microblogging as a more personal form of democratic interaction between the electors and the elected. Both Howard Dean and John McCain are both credited with pioneering and perfecting this grassroots medium utilization.

Ironically, the chapter predicts microblogging reaching its apex during the 2008 elections, which would feature none other than John McCain. While McCain used microblogging effectively; his opponent Barack Obama brilliantly carried out the most effective internet medium based campaign to date. Obama's successful implementation of strategic targeted microblogging resulted in his election to the presidency over McCain.

== Ch. 6: Professional Journalist Join the Conversation ==
BBC launched iCan to get the interaction of the audience. It gives the audience a chance to be in charge of what is reported. In South Korea, OhmyNews is an example of the system where the audience can report on the news. It gives a glimpse at the future of systems like BBC’s iCan idea. The audience’s interaction is where everyone can be a reporter. They cover the issues that are not covered by the mainstream media. They also can force mainstream media to make a local issue national or global. OhmyNews “capture[s] the power of average people”.

Gillmor discusses the importance of feedback from readers. He feels as though reporters do not engage their readers if they do not acknowledge their readers' thoughts. His example is an article called the "Jane’s Intelligence Review." The article details an organization wanting to know if their computer security article was on the right track. The organization posted the article on their site for users and readers to comment on. The readers responded with harsh and honest feedback, much to their surprise. They found that readers know more than the professionals.

== Ch. 7: The Former Audience Joins the Party ==
This chapter speaks on the effect that bloggers and many others have had over the years and how they have developed. Hossein Derakhshan made what Gillmor considers the first the Persian-language weblogger. Derakhshan launched his site in December 2000. His site encourages other Iranians to set up their own blogs. The blogs are a cross-section of Iranian society.

Many big companies have been trying to hide their information behind “intellectual property” rights. This has the ability to threaten Americans right to free speech. Wikipedia, which uses wiki software, allows anyone to post anything and edit any page. Being an open resource has helped it escape most vandalism and become a credible source of information.

== Ch. 8: Next Steps ==
Gillmor discusses Moore's Law, which he mentions will have a large influence on changing new media for the better. The Pew Internet & American Life found that in mid-2003, less than half of adult Internet users had used the internet to “publish their thoughts, respond to others, post pictures, share files and otherwise contribute to the explosion of content available online.” Gillmor writes how this has to change for "future inventions" to take hold in the upcoming digital age.

During this time, the ability to get the news you want was a hallmark of the networked world. RSS affected how individuals collected information from many different sites. It was a pioneering aspect in how new media became organized, which only increased the change of new media in the early 1990s. Another program, Technorati, was created by Dave Sifry in 2002. The Technorati API (applications programming interface) hooks one piece of software to another. Gillmor believes this program's influence can control new media, rather than erode businesses.

== Ch. 9: Trolls, Spin, and the Boundaries of Trust ==
In this chapter, Gillmor exposes various modes of deception in the modern media. He uses eight subtopics to illustrate the concepts. These explain the distortions of perception, discuss the misleading practice of image manipulations, and the effect of anonymity on the credibility of sourcing in internet-based media.

Gillmor goes on to define and explain the effects of trolls on the media, discuss the effects of information provided by biased and motivated groups, and expresses the correcting influence of fact-checking on digital media by non-traditional media contributors. He poses the question of whether the media, influenced by the weight of the prevalent false information, will implode from the effect of lost credibility.

== Ch. 10: Here Come the Judges (and Lawyers) ==
In a society where "anything goes," Gillmor warns of legal ramifications that may befall bloggers and online journalists. Legal ramifications include libel, defamation, plagiarism, forbidden links, and copyright infringement.

Even if one retracts an incorrect statement, one can still get sued for defamation and libel. Gillmor argues that a writer cannot libel a public figure unless he publishes with "malice."

Whether or not the elements of defamation are met depends on jurisdiction as one country's laws may differ from another's. If a blogger writes an opinion piece about someone who resides in another country, the person in the piece can sue the blogger in their own country, regardless of the blogger's home country. A blog's community comments are protected under the Free-speech Amendment of the U.S. Constitution.

== Ch. 11: The Empires Strike Back ==
The web's new freedom was at first thought to create a true customer. However, as technology advanced, governments, telecommunication companies and big businesses would try to stop progress. All information sent and received had the capability of being tracked and filtered. In the mid-1990s HTTP Cookies, developed by Netscape, created privacy issues. Additionally with the expansion of the web, copyright laws no longer had a clear creator/user line.

Phone and cable companies monopolized pipe lines, not wanting to provide inter-communications to competitors. Another issue became the regulation of the airways. The U.S. licensed specific parts of the airways in the 1930s to certain government agencies and companies. The FCC Spectrum Policy Task Force. was then created.

== Ch. 12: Making Our Own News ==
In Chapter 12, Gillmor examines the power and influence that the Internet has over journalism. He states that his goal for writing the book was to persuade his audience of the consequences that journalists, newsmakers, and the news audience are suffering from in the age of technology.

Gillmor reveals that he released We the Media under a Creative Commons license. He had print copies in store and free versions on the Internet available for download. He released the book with a 14-year copyright; far less than the standard copyright, which lasts for “the life of the author, plus 75 years.”

== Epilogue ==
On March 10, 2004, Dan Gillmor posted a draft of We the Media on his weblog. Together with his readers, they edited the book using the ideas contained within it to assist in the writing. In spring of 2003, the larger outline of the book was posted online with mixed reviews.

That same year, disaster struck as Gillmor’s inbox containing the myriad of edits had vanished overnight, leaving his editing in shambles. He attempted to reconstruct them using local backups, but many edits and comments were lost in doing so. Gillmor called the project afterwards "in a sense, a test of the next version of journalism."

== See also ==
- Groklaw
