= Meporter =

Mobile phone application

Meporter was a citizen journalist mobile phone application that used geolocation and multimedia to create hyperlocal, real-time news. The name is a combination of Me and Reporter. Users posted news with headlines, text, videos, and images using their smartphones to the Meporter database and to the Meporter website; users could have the story pinpointed on a map using GPS. When the story was uploaded, it was viewable by other reporters via their smartphone or the Meporter website. Users earned "Press Passes", that were similar to Foursquare Badges, which could be exchanged for prizes.

== Features ==
Meporter was a multimedia-based system that allowed users to upload text, images, and videos to the events on meporter. Unlike other geolocation apps, Meporter did not have character limits on the text, so users could upload as much text as they deemed necessary to the database. The Meporter development team did not edit any of the user uploaded media on Meporter.

Meporter had a point system that awarded "Press Passes" to individuals who uploaded content and meet certain criteria. If the participating business was involved with the Press Pass, they could offer prizes to Press Pass holders. For instance, Forbes magazine offered a free 6-month subscription to reporters who posted 10 stories to the business category.

== Partnerships and events ==
Meporter launched in 2011, at The TechCrunch Disrupt Conference in New York City. It was featured on Fox Business Network, The New York Times, The Washington Post and The Huffington Post. Meporter has partnered with several businesses, brands, and events including Forbes magazine, The Vans Warped Tour, Willie Nelson's Country Throwdown Tour, and Rockstar Mayhem Festival.
