= GroundReport =

Citizen journalism website

- Website type: Blog
- Available in: English
- Website: groundreport.com
- Commercial: Yes
- Registration: Optional
- Launched: 2006
- Current status: Sold to Search-Ladder, LLC

GroundReport was a citizen journalism website that enabled contributors to publish news reports and videos. The site was owned by a nonprofit organization called Open News Platform until mid-2017. Since the site did not attract enough donations and advertisement revenue to sustain it, Open News Platform sold the GroundReport.com domain and platform to Search-Ladder, LLC in 2017. Search-Ladder is a digital marketing agency. The sale was completed in May 2017.

== Beginnings ==
Journalist Rachel Sterne started GroundReport.com in 2006. She wanted to make such a site after her experience reporting on Darfur as an intern at the United Nations. To run GroundReport, Sterne started Open News Platform, a not-for-profit 501(c)(3) organization incorporated in New York. In 2008, Sterne expressed a wish to expand GroundReport with regional editions. In 2009, BusinessWeek named Sterne one of "America's Most Promising Social Entrepreneurs".

== Content ==
GroundReport used a Wikipedia-like model of volunteer editors and community feedback, combined with a star rating system. Contributors chose from a range of Creative Commons licenses. On September 17, 2008, select contributors were given the ability to revise content in any article. In May 2009, GroundReport implemented a vetting system that requires review and approval of every contributor.

According to Adweek, GroundReport received 29,187 unique visitors in December 2010, down from 60,802 monthly unique visitors earlier that year. The Adweek journalist commented: "Even during major events, GroundReport's influence was very small. As the BBC News reported in an article on Dec. 1, 2008, following terror attacks in Mumbai that had been covered on the site, 'it is worth noting that the original story on the GroundReport Web site has attracted fewer than 200 viewers so far, whereas untold millions have watched television reports in India and around the world.'" GroundReport's content was syndicated to Google News.

In July 2015, volunteers from Injustice Anywhere began to help with restructuring, and a redesign of GroundReport.com launched on September 22, 2015.
