= Dan Gillmor =

American technology writer

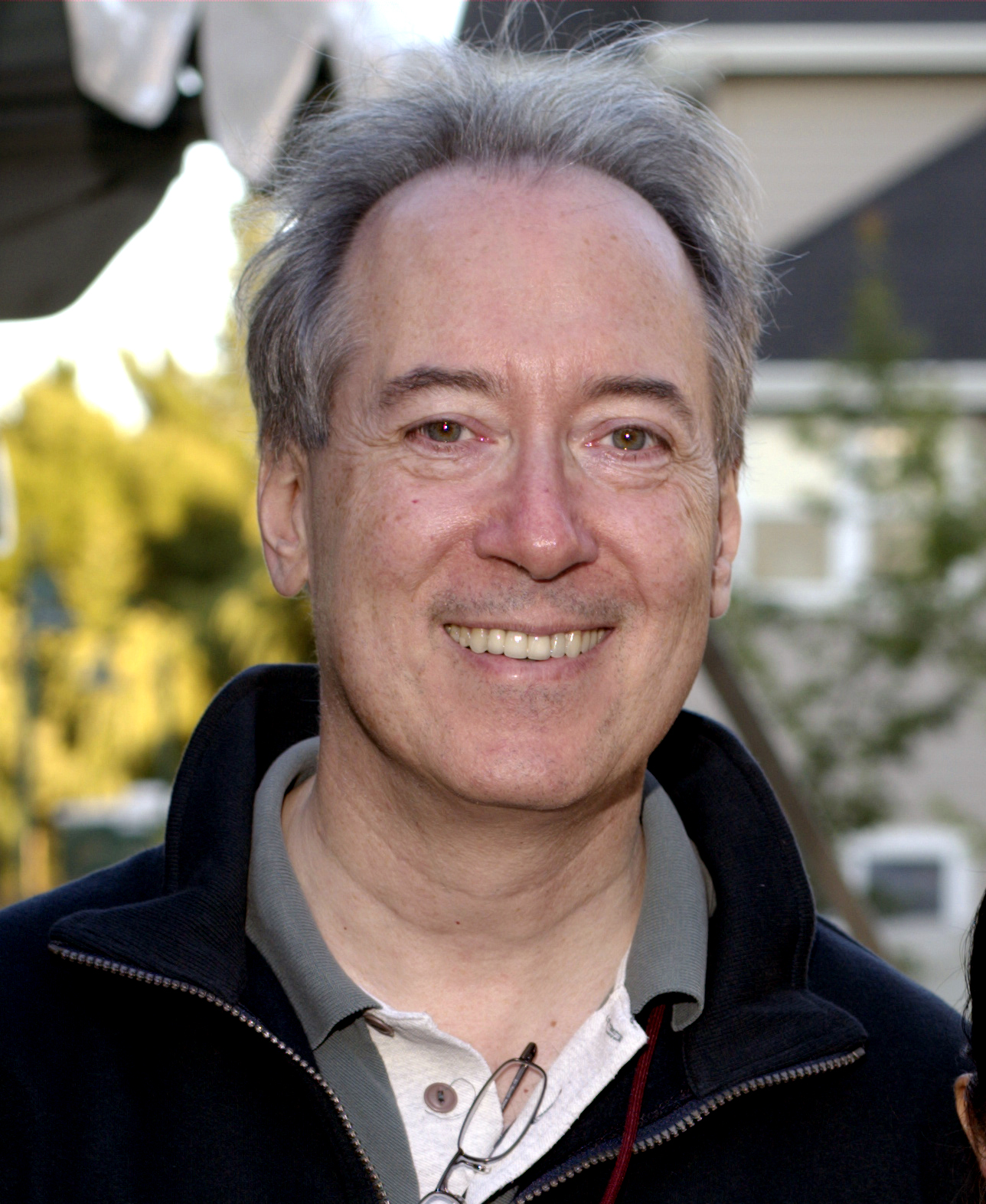
- Gillmor in 2005
- Born: 1951 (age 74–75)
- Education: Middlebury College; University of Vermont (BA, 1981)
- Occupations: Director, News Co/Lab, Arizona State University
- Website: dangillmor.com

Dan Gillmor (born 1951) is an American technology writer and columnist. He was director of News Co/Lab, an initiative to elevate news literacy and awareness, at Arizona State University's Walter Cronkite School of Journalism and Mass Communication. Gillmor is also in the board of directors of The Signals Network, a non-profit organization supporting whistleblowers.

== Early life and education ==
Gillmor was born and raised in upstate New York. In 1969, he enrolled at Middlebury College for three semesters. He later enrolled at the University of Vermont, graduating with a degree in political science in 1981.

== Career ==
Before becoming a journalist, Gillmor worked as a musician, singing, playing guitar, and songwriting for the band Road Apple.

During the 1986–87 academic year he was a Michigan Journalism Fellow at the University of Michigan in Ann Arbor, where he studied history, political theory and economics. Gillmor worked at the Kansas City Times and several newspapers in Vermont, followed by six years at the Detroit Free Press.

From 1994 to 2005, Gillmor was a columnist at the San Jose Mercury News, Silicon Valley’s daily newspaper, during which time he became a leading chronicler of the dot-com boom and its subsequent bust. Starting in October 1999, he wrote a weblog for The Mercury News, which is believed to have been the first by a journalist for a traditional media company. Gillmor's eJournal archives were believed to be lost but have been found in the Internet Archive and are now restored at Bayosphere.com.

Gillmor left The Mercury News in January 2005 to work on a start-up venture in citizen journalism called Bayosphere, which aimed to "make it easier for the public to report and publish on the Internet." Launched in May 2005, Bayosphere closed in January 2006.

After closing Bayosphere, Gillmor moved on to a new project, the Center for Citizen Media, a non-profit organization affiliated with the UC Berkeley Graduate School of Journalism and the Berkman Center for Internet & Society at Harvard University Law School.

In 2007, Gillmor co-founded Dopplr, an online travel application project.

In November 2007, Gillmor was named founding director of Arizona State University's new Knight Center for Digital Media Entrepreneurship at the Walter Cronkite School of Journalism and Mass Communication. Gillmor has been a board member of the Global Editors Network since its creation in April 2011.

== Awards and honors ==
Gillmor won the EFF Pioneer Award in 2002.

== Works ==
=== Books ===
Gillmor is the author of We the Media (2004), which describes the Internet as an opportunity for independent journalists to challenge the consolidation of traditional media and contains Gillmor's widely cited realization: "my readers know more than I do." The book offers a guide to new internet tools for journalists, including weblogs, RSS, SMS, peer-to-peer, and predicts how these tools will change journalism.

In 2009, Gillmor published Mediactive, a book on digital media literacy. One review noted that the book's "thesis in itself is neither new nor original", but that the book represents "the first time someone has put it all down in one place".

== See also ==
- Network media
