= Charles Nesson =

American lawyer (born 1939)

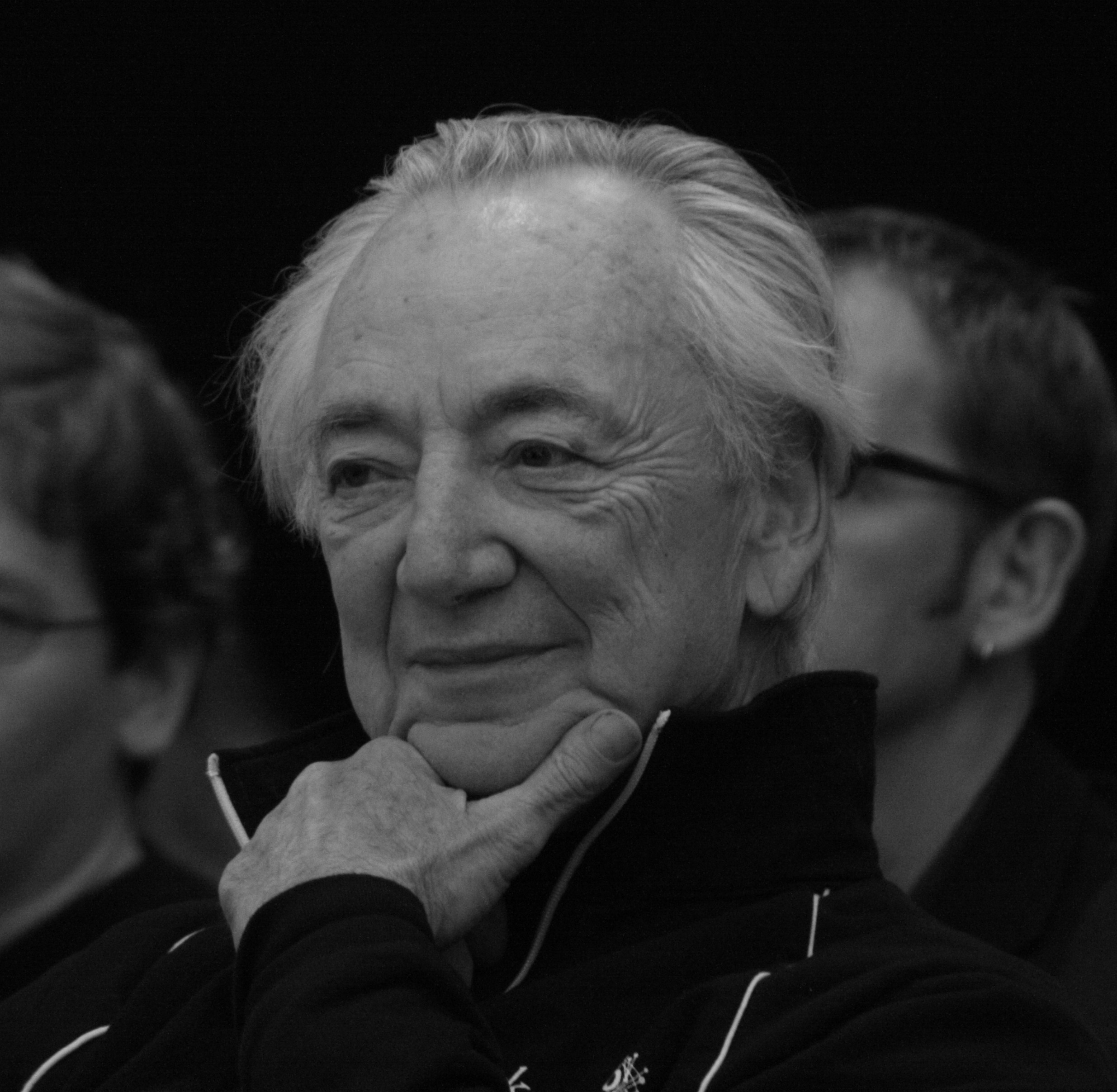
- Nesson in 2008
- Born: February 11, 1939 (age 87)
- Education: Harvard University (BA, LLB)
- Occupations: Law professor; author
- Spouse: Fern Leicher Nesson
- Children: 2
- Website: cyber.law.harvard.edu/people/cnesson

Charles Rothwell Nesson (born February 11, 1939) is an American legal scholar. He is the William F. Weld Professor of Law at Harvard Law School and the founder of the Berkman Center for Internet & Society and of the Global Poker Strategic Thinking Society. He is the author of Evidence, with Murray and Green, and has participated in several cases before the U.S. Supreme Court, including the landmark case Daubert v. Merrell Dow Pharmaceuticals.

In 1971, Nesson defended Daniel Ellsberg in the Pentagon Papers case. He was co-counsel for the plaintiffs in the case against W. R. Grace and Company that was made into the book A Civil Action, which was, in turn, made into the film of the same name. Nesson's nickname in the book, Billion-Dollar Charlie, was given to him by Mark Phillips, who worked with him on the W.R. Grace case.

As of 2011, Nesson was currently "interested in advancing justice in Jamaica, the evolution of the Internet, as well as [the United States'] national drug policy."

== Early life and education ==
Nesson attended Harvard College as an undergraduate, studying mathematics. He took the law school boards junior year, earning a nearly perfect score, but he was initially rejected early admission from Harvard Law School for his grades. After improving his grades, Nesson was accepted. Nesson surprised himself by achieving and retaining a ranking of first out of five hundred students. He is rumored to have achieved the highest grade point average since Felix Frankfurter (later a Justice on the Supreme Court of the United States) graduated in 1907. In 1962, he received the Sears Prize of US$750 (equivalent to $8,000 in 2025) for the highest grade average in the first and second years of law school.

Nesson was a law clerk to Supreme Court Justice John Marshall Harlan II, 1965 term. He then worked as a special assistant in the United States Department of Justice Civil Rights Division under John Doar. While there, his first civil rights case, White v. Crook in the United States District Court for the Northern District of Alabama, made race-based and gender-based jury selection in Alabama unconstitutional.

Nesson joined the Harvard Law School faculty in 1966, and was tenured three years later. In 1998, he co-founded Harvard's Berkman Center for Internet & Society.

== Career ==
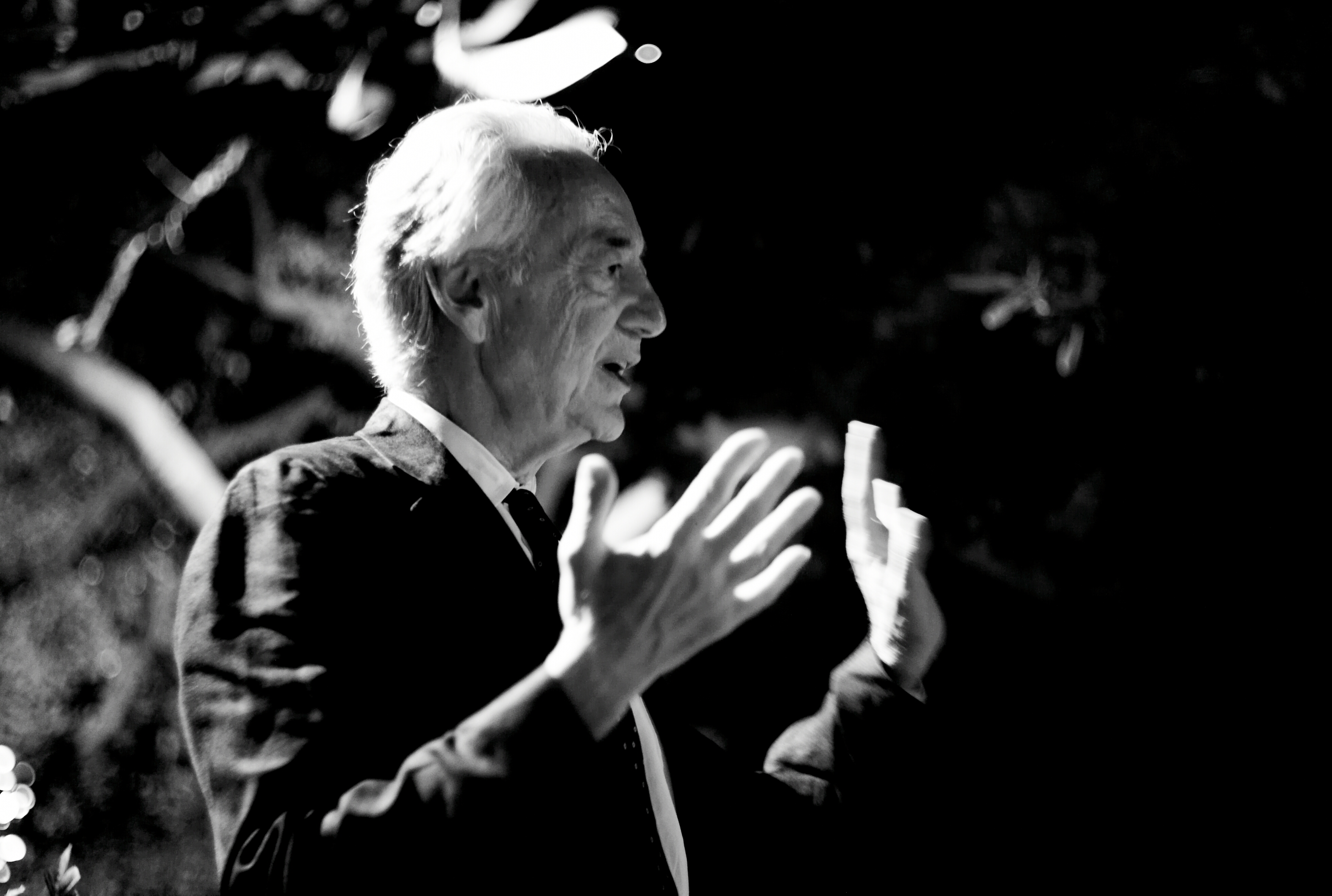
Nesson at an iCommons meeting in Dubrovnik 2007

In 2006, Nesson taught CyberOne: Law in the Court of Public Opinion with Rebecca Nesson and Gene Koo. He teaches courses in the law and practice of evidence, Trials in Second Life, where he is represented by his avatar "Eon", and a reading group on Freedom with Fern Nesson He also teaches a class on the American Jury.

Nesson led projects to "reify university as a meta player in cyberspace", to advance restorative justice in Jamaica, and to legitimize and teach poker and the value of strategic poker thinking. For the last one, he made an appearance on The Colbert Report in January 2008. When Colbert joked that Nesson may have a gambling problem, he responded, "My gambling problem is that poker gets lumped in with gambling."

In May 2008, he represented Keith Stroup – the founder of National Organization for the Reform of Marijuana Laws, and Richard Cusick – an associate publisher of High Times magazine, who wished to challenge Massachusetts marijuana possession laws after they were arrested for smoking marijuana at the 2007 Boston Freedom Rally. The defendants were found guilty and sentenced to a day in jail.

In 2009, Nesson acted as defense lawyer for Joel Tenenbaum, who was accused of downloading and sharing 31 songs on the Kazaa file-sharing network; the jury came to a $675,000 verdict against Tenenbaum. Many of Nesson's less conventional actions during the case, including an "almost obsessive desire for transparency and documentation", drew criticism. Nesson had encouraged Tenenbaum to admit that he had downloaded and shared the 31 songs after he had denied it in depositions.

As of 2015, Nesson was pro bono counsel to the Westmoreland Hemp & Ganja Farmers Association in Jamaica.

== Publications ==
Selected publications:

- Reasonable Doubt and Permissive Inferences: The Value of Complexity, 92 Harvard Law Review 1187 (1979)
- The Evidence or the Event? On Judicial Proof and the Acceptability of Verdicts, 98 Harvard Law Review 1357 (1985)
- Agent Orange Meets the Blue Bus: Factfinding at the Frontier of Knowledge, 66 B.U.L. Rev. 521 (1986)
- Incentives to Spoliate Evidence in Civil Litigation: The Need for Vigorous Judicial Action, 13 Cardozo L. Rev. 793 (1991)
- Constitutional Hearsay: Requiring Foundational Testing and Corroboration under the Confrontation Clause, 81 Va. L. Rev. 149 (1995), with Yochai Benkler
- Green, Nesson & Murray, Evidence (2001, 3rd ed. Aspen)

== Personal life ==
Following his tenure at Harvard, Nesson married Fern Leicher Nesson, one of his students, and bought a home in Cambridge, Massachusetts, near the Harvard campus, where they were living as of 2009. The Nessons have two daughters, Rebecca and Leila.

== See also ==
- List of law clerks for the ninth seat of the Supreme Court of the United States
