= Citizen journalism =

Journalism genre

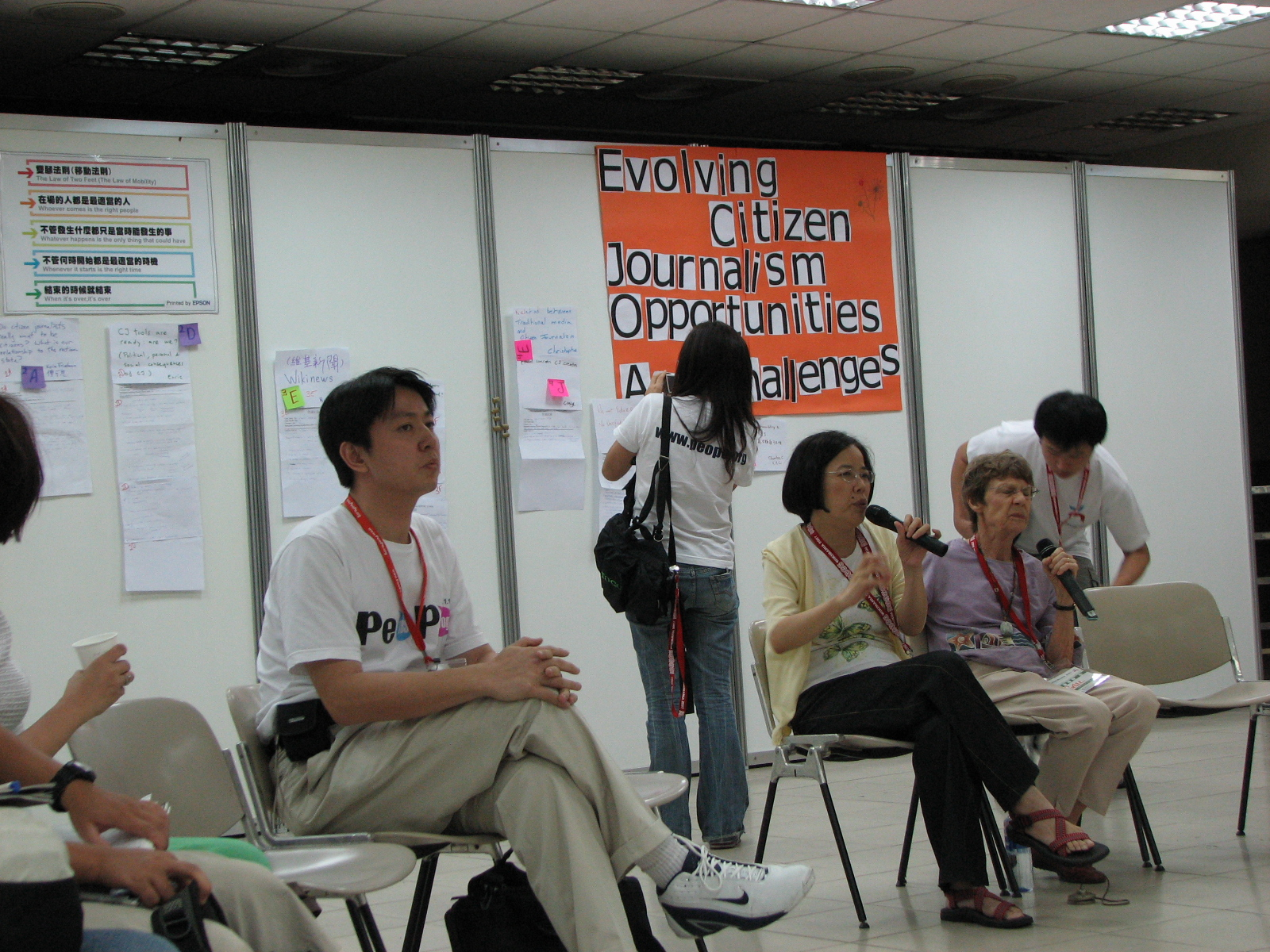
Wikimania 2007 Citizen Journalism Unconference

Citizen journalism, also known as collaborative media, participatory journalism, democratic journalism, guerrilla journalism, grassroots journalism, or street journalism, is based upon members of the community playing an active role in the process of collecting, reporting, analyzing, and disseminating news and information. Courtney C. Radsch defines citizen journalism "as an alternative and activist form of news gathering and reporting that functions outside mainstream media institutions, often as a response to shortcomings in the professional journalistic field, that uses similar journalistic practices but is driven by different objectives and ideals and relies on alternative sources of legitimacy than traditional or mainstream journalism". Jay Rosen offers a simpler definition: "When the people formerly known as the audience employ the press tools they have in their possession to inform one another." The underlying principle of citizen journalism is that ordinary people, not professional journalists, can be the main creators and distributors of news. Citizen journalism should not be confused with community journalism or civic journalism, both of which are practiced by professional journalists; collaborative journalism, which is the practice of professional and non-professional journalists working together; and social journalism, which denotes a digital publication with a hybrid of professional and non-professional journalism. According to Seungahn Nah and Deborah S. Chung in their book "Understanding Citizen Journalism as Civic Participation" citizen journalism is "highly embedded in local communities where community residents engage in day-to-day routines of community storytelling about local politics, public affairs, community events, neighborhood issues, schools, public transportation, land uses and environments, and much more."

Citizen journalism is a specific form of both citizen media and user-generated content (UGC). By juxtaposing the term "citizen", with its attendant qualities of civic-mindedness and social responsibility, with that of "journalism", which refers to a particular profession, Courtney C. Radsch argues that this term best describes this particular form of online and digital journalism conducted by amateurs because it underscores the link between the practice of journalism and its relation to the political and public sphere.

Citizen journalism was made more feasible by the development of various online internet platforms. New media technology, such as social networking and media-sharing websites, in addition to the increasing prevalence of cellular telephones, have made citizen journalism more accessible to people worldwide. Recent advances in new media have started to have a profound political impact. Due to the availability of technology, citizens often can report breaking news more quickly than traditional media reporters. Notable examples of citizen journalism reporting from major world events are, the 2010 Haiti earthquake, the Arab Spring, the Occupy Wall Street movement, the 2013 protests in Turkey, the Euromaidan events in Ukraine, and Syrian Civil War, the 2014 Ferguson unrest, the Black Lives Matter movement, and the Russian Invasion of Ukraine.

Being that citizen journalism is yet to develop a conceptual framework and guiding principles, it can be heavily opinionated and subjective, making it more supplemental than primary in terms of forming public opinion. Critics of the phenomenon, including professional journalists and news organizations, claim that citizen journalism is unregulated, amateur, and haphazard in quality and coverage. Furthermore, citizen journalists, due to their lack of professional affiliation, are thought to lack resources as well as focus on how best to serve the public. A research team of citizen journalists created an OER library that contains video interviews to provide access to reliable sources.

== Theory ==
Citizen journalism, as a form of alternative media, presents a "radical challenge to the professionalized and institutionalized practices of the mainstream media".

According to Flew, there have been three elements critical to the rise of citizen journalism: open publishing, collaborative editing, and distributed content. Mark Glaser said in 2006:.

…people without professional journalism training can use the tools of modern technology and the global distribution of the Internet to create, augment or fact-check media on their own or in collaboration with others.

In What is Participatory Journalism? (2003), J. D. Lasica classifies media for citizen journalism into the following types:

1. Audience participation (such as user comments attached to news stories, personal blogs, photographs or video footage captured from personal mobile cameras, or local news written by residents of a community)
2. Independent news and information Websites (Consumer Reports, the Drudge Report)
3. Full-fledged participatory news sites (one:convo, NowPublic, OhmyNews, DigitalJournal.com, GroundReport, 'Fair Observer')
4. Collaborative and contributory media sites (Slashdot, Kuro5hin, Newsvine)
5. Other kinds of "thin media" (mailing lists, email newsletters)
6. Personal broadcasting sites (video broadcast sites such as KenRadio)
7. Open source news platforms (such as Veiwapp and Wikinews)

The literature of citizen, alternative, and participatory journalism is most often situated in a democratic context and theorized as a response to corporate news media dominated by an economic logic. Some scholars have sought to extend the study of citizen journalism beyond the developed Western world, including Sylvia Moretzsohn, Courtney C. Radsch, and Clemencia Rodríguez. Radsch, for example, wrote that "Throughout the Arab world, citizen journalists have emerged as the vanguard of new social movements dedicated to promoting human rights and democratic values."

=== Theories of citizenship ===
According to Vincent Campbell, theories of citizenship can be categorized into two core groups: those that consider journalism for citizenship, and those that consider journalism as citizenship. The classical model of citizenship is the base of the two theories of citizenship. The classical model is rooted in the ideology of informed citizens and places emphasis on the role of journalists rather than on citizens.

The classical model has four main characteristics:

- journalists' role of informing citizens
- citizens are assumed to be informed if they regularly attend to the news they are supplied with
- more informed citizens are more likely to participate
- the more informed citizens participate, the more democratic a state is more likely to be.

The first characteristic upholds the theory that journalism is for citizens. One of the main issues with this is that there is a normative judgement surrounding the amount and nature of information that citizens should have as well as what the relationship between the two should be. One branch of journalism for citizens is the "monitorial citizen" (coined by Michael Schudson). The "monitorial citizen" suggests that citizens appropriately and strategically select what news and information they consume. The "monitorial citizen" along with other forms of this ideology conceive individuals as those who do things with information to enact change and citizenship. However, this production of information does not equal to an act of citizenship, but instead an act of journalism. Therefore, citizens and journalists are portrayed as distinctive roles whereas journalism is used by citizens for citizenship and conversely, journalists serve citizens.

The second theory considers journalism as citizenship. This theory focuses on the different aspects of citizen identity and activity and understands citizen journalism as directly constituting citizenship. The term "liquid citizenship" (coined by Zizi Papacharissi) depicts how the lifestyles that individuals engage in allow them to interact with other individuals and organizations, which thus remaps the conceptual periphery of civic, political, and social. This "liquid citizenship" allows the interactions and experiences that individuals face to become citizen journalism where they create their own forms of journalism. An alternative approach of journalism as citizenship rests between the distinction between "dutiful" citizens and "actualizing" citizens. "Dutiful" citizens engage in traditional citizenship practices, while "actualizing" citizens engage in non-traditional citizenship practices. This alternative approach suggests that "actualizing" citizens are less likely to use traditional media and more likely to use online and social media as sources of information, discussion, and participation. Thus, journalism in the form of online and social media practices become a form of citizenship for actualizing citizens.

Criticisms have been made against citizen journalism, especially from among professionals in the field. Citizen journalists are often portrayed as unreliable, biased and untrained – as opposed to professionals who have "recognition, paid work, unionized labour and behaviour that is often politically neutral and unaffiliated, at least in the claim if not in the actuality".

== History ==
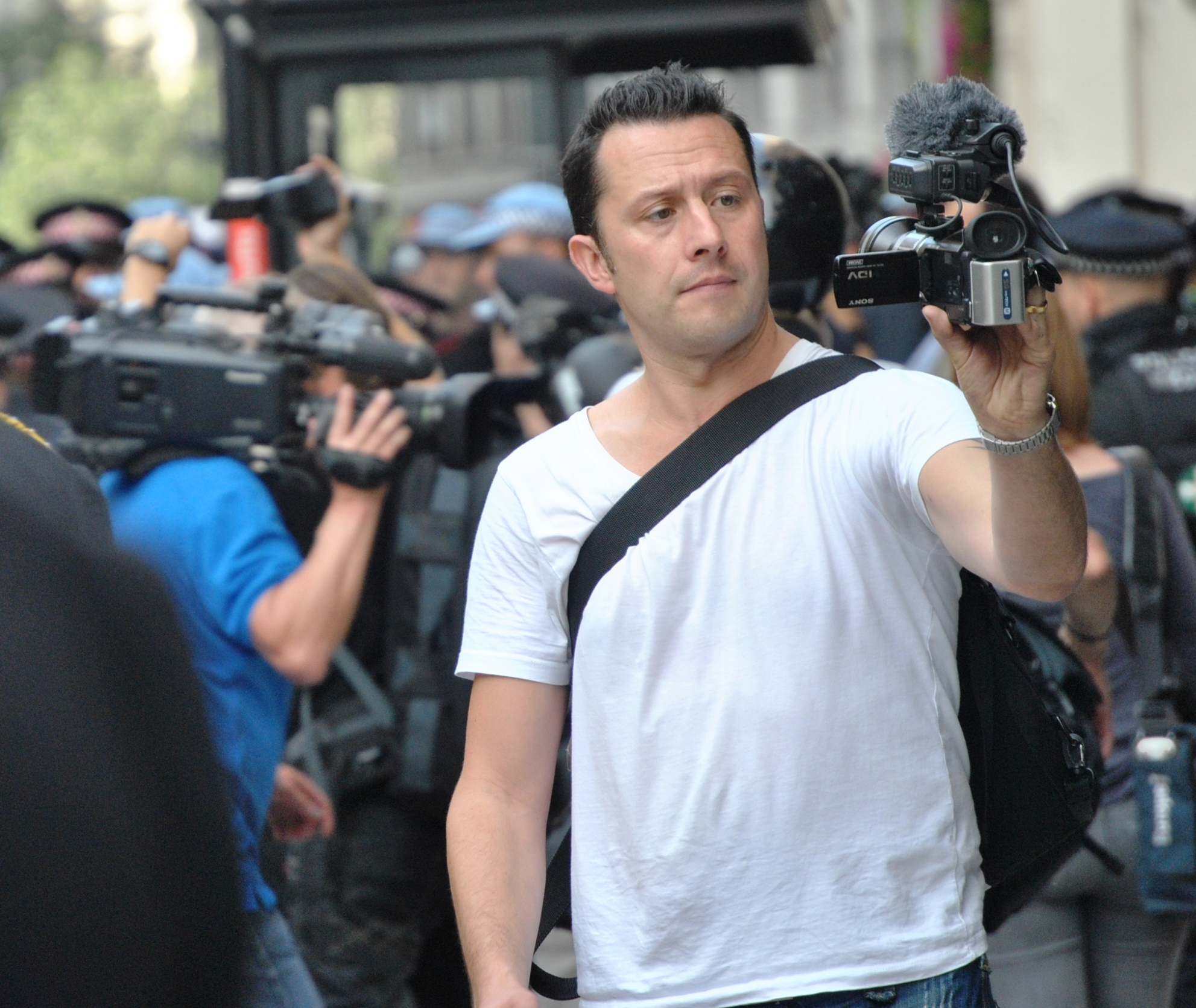
Citizen journalist at English Defense League demonstration in London, 2011

The idea that every citizen can engage in acts of journalism has a long history in the United States. "As early as the 1920s, journalist and political commentator Walter Lippman and American philosopher John Dewey debated the role of journalism in democracy, including the extent that the public should participate in the news-gathering and production processes." According to research conducted by Blaagaard (2018), citizen journalism in St. Croix, between 1915 and 1925, provided a platform for colonized communities. Helping them express their perspectives and address certain social injustices that were overlooked at the time by colonial authorities. Local publications, for example The Herald, became a pathway for unheard voices to challenge dominant narratives. The contemporary citizen journalist movement emerged after journalists began to question the predictability of their coverage of events such as the 1988 U.S. presidential election. Those journalists became part of the public, or civic, journalism movement, which sought to counter the erosion of trust in the news media and the widespread disillusionment with politics and civic affairs.

Initially, discussions of public journalism focused on promoting journalism that was "for the people" by changing the way professional reporters did their work. According to Leonard Witt, however, early public journalism efforts were "often part of 'special projects' that were expensive, time-consuming, and episodic. Too often these projects dealt with an issue and moved on. Professional journalists were driving the discussion. They would have the goal of doing a story on welfare-to-work (or the environment, or traffic problems, or the economy), and then they would recruit a cross-section of citizens and chronicle their points of view. Since not all reporters and editors bought into this form of public journalism, and some outright opposed it, reaching out to the people from the newsroom was never an easy task." By 2003, in fact, the movement seemed to be petering out, with the Pew Center for Civic Journalism closing its doors.

Traditionally, the term "citizen journalism" has had a history of struggle with deliberating on a concise and mutually agreed upon definition. Even today, the term lacks a clear form of conceptualization. Although the term lacks conceptualization, alternative names of the term are unable to comprehensively capture the phenomenon. For example, one of the interchangeable names with "citizen journalism" is "user-generated content" (UGC). However, the issue with this alternative term is that it eliminates the potential civic virtues of citizen journalism and considers it to be stunted and proprietorial.

With today's technology the citizen journalist movement has found new life as the average person can capture news and distribute it globally. As Yochai Benkler has noted, "the capacity to make meaning – to encode and decode humanly meaningful statements – and the capacity to communicate one's meaning around the world, are held by, or readily available to, at least many hundreds of millions of users around the globe." Professor Mary-Rose Papandrea, a constitutional law professor at UNC School of Law, notes in her article, "Citizen Journalism and the Reporter's Privilege", that:

"[i]n many ways, the definition of "journalism" has now come full circle. When the First Amendment was adopted, "freedom of the press" referred quite literally to the freedom to publish using a printing press, rather than the freedom of organized entities engaged in the publishing business. … It was not until the late nineteenth century that the concept of the "press" morphed into a description of individuals and companies engaged in an often competitive commercial media enterprise."

A 2004 trend of citizen journalism has been the emergence of what blogger Jeff Jarvis terms hyperlocal journalism, as online news sites invite contributions from local residents of their subscription areas, who often report on topics that conventional newspapers tend to ignore. "We are the traditional journalism model turned upside down," explains Mary Lou Fulton, the publisher of the Northwest Voice in Bakersfield, California. "Instead of being the gatekeeper, telling people that what's important to them 'isn't news,' we're just opening up the gates and letting people come on in. We are a better community newspaper for having thousands of readers who serve as the eyes and ears for the Voice, rather than having everything filtered through the views of a small group of reporters and editors."

== Citizen journalists ==
According to Jay Rosen, citizen journalists are "the people formerly known as the audience," who "were on the receiving end of a media system that ran one way, in a broadcasting pattern, with high entry fees and a few firms competing to speak very loudly while the rest of the population listened in isolation from one another— and who today are not in a situation like that at all. ... The people formerly known as the audience are simply the public made realer, less fictional, more able, less predictable."

Abraham Zapruder, who filmed the assassination of President John Fitzgerald Kennedy with a home-movie camera, is sometimes presented as an ancestor to citizen journalists. Egyptian citizen Wael Abbas was awarded several international reporting prizes for his blog Misr Digital (Digital Egypt) and a video he publicized of two policemen beating a bus driver helped lead to their conviction.

During 9/11 many eyewitness accounts of the terrorist attacks on the World Trade Center came from citizen journalists. Images and stories from citizen journalists close to the World Trade Center offered content that played a major role in the story.

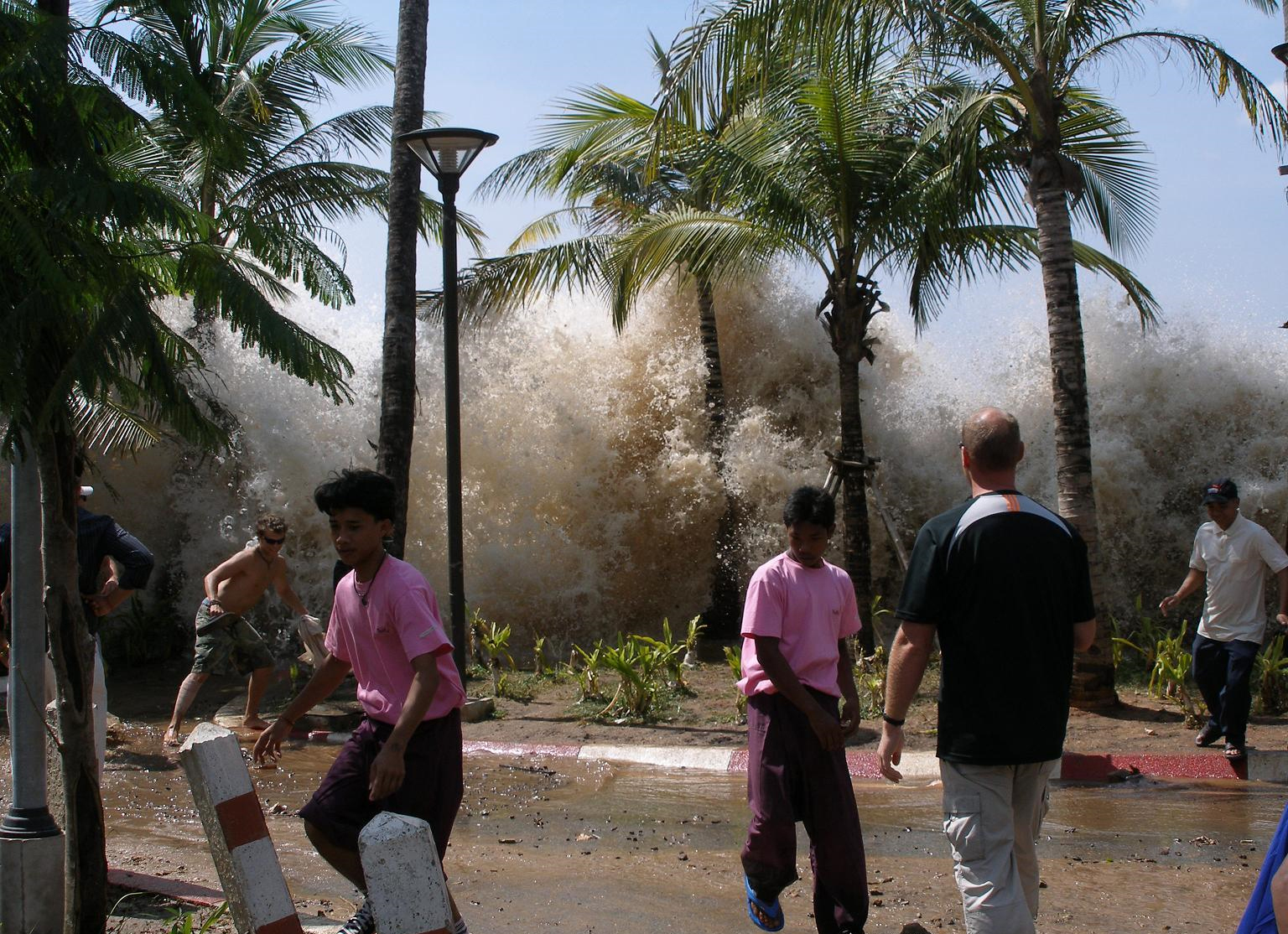
2004 tsunami picture taken by a bystander and uploaded to Wikimedia Commons

In 2004, when the 9.1-magnitude underwater earthquake caused a huge tsunami in Banda Aceh Indonesia and across the Indian Ocean, a weblog-based virtual network of previously unrelated bloggers emerged that covered the news in real-time, and became a vital source for the traditional media for the first week after the tsunami. A large amount of news footage from many people who experienced the tsunami was widely broadcast, as well as a good deal of "on the scene" citizen reporting and blogger analysis that was subsequently picked up by the major media outlets worldwide.

Subsequent to the citizen journalism coverage of the disaster and aftermath, researchers have suggested that citizen journalists may, in fact, play a critical role in the disaster warning system itself, potentially with higher reliability than the networks of tsunami warning equipment based on technology alone which then require interpretation by disinterested third parties.

The microblog Twitter played an important role during the 2009 Iranian election protests, after foreign journalists had effectively been "barred from reporting". Twitter delayed scheduled maintenance during the protests that would have shut down coverage in Iran due to the role it played in public communication.

Social media platforms such as blogs, YouTube, and Twitter encourage and facilitate engagement with other citizens who participate in creating content through commenting, liking, linking, and sharing. The majority of the content produced by these amateur news bloggers was not original content, but curated information monitored and edited by these various bloggers. There has been a decline in the amateur news blogger due to social media platforms that are much easier to run and maintain, allowing individuals to easily share and create and content.

Wikimedia Foundation hosts a participatory journalism web site, Wikinews.

The 2021 Pulitzer Prize Winner in Special Citations and Awards was awarded to Darnella Frazier, who recorded the murder of George Floyd on her phone.

== Citizen journalism in a worldwide context ==
=== India ===
I don't believe in citizen journalists. I say give me citizen doctors and citizen lawyers and I'll give you citizen journalists.

— Shekhar Gupta

India has a broad media landscape expanding at "double-digit growth rates" in comparison to the West. Issues surrounding human rights violations, violence against women and everyday witness accounts. Most notably, images shared on Twitter during the 2008 Mumbai attacks is an example of citizen journalism in India.

=== Iraq ===
In 2004 Daylight Magazine sent a box of disposable cameras to be distributed to civilians living in Baghdad and Fallujah. These were published in May 2004 along with the work of seminal documentarians such as Susan Meiselas, Roger Hutchings, etc. In June 2004 Fred Ritchen and Pixel Press teamed up with Daylight to create a touring exhibition of the images and captions which went to various institutions around the United States including: The Council on Foreign Relations, The Center for Photography Woodstock, New York University, Union College, Michigan University, and Central Michigan University before being donated to the Archive of Documentary Art at Duke University.

=== United Kingdom ===
Citizen Journalism provides a platform for individuals to be considered and acknowledged on a global scale. The circulation of information and news does not fully divulge the accurate perceptions of what is going on in the world. For instance, On Our Radar contains reporting mechanisms and trained residents that reveal their voices while questioning the reluctance journalism has when considering what voices are heard and are not, based in London. On Our Radar has undertaken in making the voices in Sierra Leone heard in regards to Ebola, revealing that it contained easy access to vital sources of information and opened more opportunities for questions and reports.

Countries which have adapted to online media outlets have been shown to have an increase of citizens who are informed of government news, as well as politically educated. Citizen journalism has filled a niche in certain countries with limited access to higher education. It has become increasingly popular in response to concerns of false information being distributed through mainstream media by governments.

In 2020, a network of local Citizen Journalist publications, the Bylines Network, was founded, and has since spread to include 10 regional branches and a podcast.

=== United States ===
Citizen Journalism can even be found in the United States, here we can find them at the frontlines at places such as protests. In a blog from Syracuse University they mention "From gun violence to mass deportations to sexual misconduct accusations leveled at powerful men, there is no shortage of reasons for the polarized American electorate to take to the streets in protest." Because social media has changed the role of the traditional news reporter, these types of events now allow for citizen journalists to keep the public informed. The blog reports that "At the same time, the rise of social media has irrevocably changed the roles of news reporters and has also enabled citizen journalists, who take risks to document highly contentious environments in order to keep the public informed." Citizen Journalists have an important duty in today's world.

=== China ===
Citizen journalism impacts Chinese media, which operates in a society that heavily controls the online activity of its people. Working against mainstream journalism in China, citizen journalism has allowed politically and socially charged information to spread, promoting change and progressive ideals. The masses can now work around the controlled and monitored mainstream media and understand the misinformation it contains.

Citizen journalists face many repercussions when unpackaging the truth and reach domestic and global audiences. Most if not all of these repercussions result from government officials and law enforcement from the journalists respective countries. Citizen journalists are needed and depended on by the mass public but are viewed as an imminent threat to their governments. The public has had the resources to pursue this level of journalism from their surroundings and based on real life perspectives that lack censorship and influence from a higher entity. The various forms citizen journalism is formed has outdated many news and media sources as result of the authentic approach citizen journalists carry out.

During the 2019–20 Hong Kong protests, fraudulent pictures encouraging people to pose as reporters and abuse freedom of press regulations to obstruct the police were widely circulated on social media with the aim to discredit citizen journalists.

In the context of China and the national pandemic rooted from the coronavirus, many voices were censored and limited when it came to citizen journalists. This occurred in the process of visually and vocally documenting the social climate of China in regards to the coronavirus. For instance, a Chinese citizen journalist posted videos of Wuhan, China as the outbreak had been spreading globally. As a result, the journalist was stopped and detained by the police and was not released for two months. In sharing their experience being detained after being released the tone it was expressed in was marketed. This citizen journalist experience is one amongst more of who were similarly detained and censored.

=== Iran ===
In 2023 after Mahsa Amini protests government criminalized Iranians filming police. In 2026 Iranian regime The Ministry of Intelligence of the Islamic Republic has issued a new directive publishing a blacklist of what it designates as “hostile".

== Criticisms ==
=== Objectivity ===
Citizen journalists also may be activists within the communities they write about. This has drawn some criticism from traditional media institutions such as The New York Times, which have accused proponents of public journalism of abandoning the traditional goal of objectivity. Researchers have also criticized this practice as not having access to real time fact checking. Many traditional journalists view citizen journalism with some skepticism, believing that only trained journalists can understand the exactitude and ethics involved in reporting news. See, e.g., Nicholas Lemann, Vincent Maher, and Tom Grubisich.

An academic paper by Vincent Maher, the head of the New Media Lab at Rhodes University, outlined several weaknesses in the claims made by citizen journalists, in terms of the "three deadly E's", referring to ethics, economics, and epistemology.

An analysis by language and linguistics professor, Patricia Bou-Franch, found that some citizen journalists resorted to abuse-sustaining discourses naturalizing violence against women. She found that these discourses were then challenged by others who questioned the gendered ideologies of male violence against women.

=== Quality ===
An article in 2005 by Tom Grubisich reviewed ten new citizen journalism sites and found many of them lacking in quality and content. Grubisich followed up a year later with, "Potemkin Village Redux." He found that the best sites had improved editorially and were even nearing profitability, but only by not expensing editorial costs. Also according to the article, the sites with the weakest editorial content were able to expand aggressively because they had stronger financial resources.

Another article published on Pressthink examined Backfence, a citizen journalism site with three initial locations in the D.C. area, which reveals that the site has only attracted limited citizen contributions. The author concludes that, "in fact, clicking through Backfence's pages feels like frontier land – remote, often lonely, zoned for people but not home to any. The site recently launched for Arlington, Virginia. However, without more settlers, Backfence may wind up creating more ghost towns."

David Simon, a former reporter for The Baltimore Sun and writer-producer of the television series The Wire, criticized the concept of citizen journalism, claiming that unpaid bloggers who write as a hobby cannot replace trained, professional, seasoned journalists.

"I am offended to think that anyone, anywhere believes American institutions as insulated, self-preserving and self-justifying as police departments, school systems, legislatures and chief executives can be held to gathered facts by amateurs pursuing the task without compensation, training or, for that matter, sufficient standing to make public officials even care to whom it is they are lying."

An editorial published by The Digital Journalist web magazine expressed a similar position, advocating to abolish the term "citizen journalist" and replace it with "citizen news gatherer".

"Professional journalists cover fires, floods, crime, the legislature, and the White House every day. There is either a fire line or police line, or security, or the Secret Service who allow them to pass upon displaying credentials vetted by the departments or agencies concerned. A citizen journalist, an amateur, will always be on the outside of those lines. Imagine the White House throwing open its gates to admit everybody with a camera phone to a presidential event."

While the fact that citizen journalists can report in real time and are not subject to oversight opens them to criticism about the accuracy of their reporting, news stories presented by mainstream media also misreport facts occasionally that are reported correctly by citizen journalists. As low as 32% of the American population have a fair amount of trust in the media.

=== Effects on traditional journalism ===
Journalism has been affected significantly due to citizen journalism. This is because citizen journalism allows people to post as much content as they want, whenever they want. In order to stay competitive, traditional news sources are forcing their journalists to compete. This means that journalists now have to write, edit and add pictures into their content and they must do so at a rapid pace, as it is perceived by news companies that it's essential for journalists to produce content at the same rate that citizens can post content on the internet. This is hard though, as many news companies are facing budget cuts and cannot afford to pay journalists the proper amount for the amount of work they do. Despite the uncertainties of a job in journalism and rising tuition costs there has been a 35% increase in journalism majors throughout the past few years according to Astra Taylor in her book The People's Platform.

=== Legal repercussions ===
Edward Greenberg, a New York City litigator, notes higher vulnerability of unprofessional journalists in court compared to the professional ones:

"So-called shield laws, which protect reporters from revealing sources, vary from state to state. On occasion, the protection is dependent on whether the person [who] asserted the claim is in fact a journalist. There are many cases at both the state and federal levels where judges determine just who is/is not a journalist. Cases involving libel often hinge on whether the actor was or was not a member of the "press"."

The view stated above does not mean that professional journalists are fully protected by shield laws. In the 1972 Branzburg v. Hayes case the Supreme Court of the United States invalidated the use of the First Amendment as a defense for reporters summoned to testify before a grand jury. In 2005, the reporter's privilege of Judith Miller and Matthew Cooper was rejected by the appellate court.

== Possible future ==
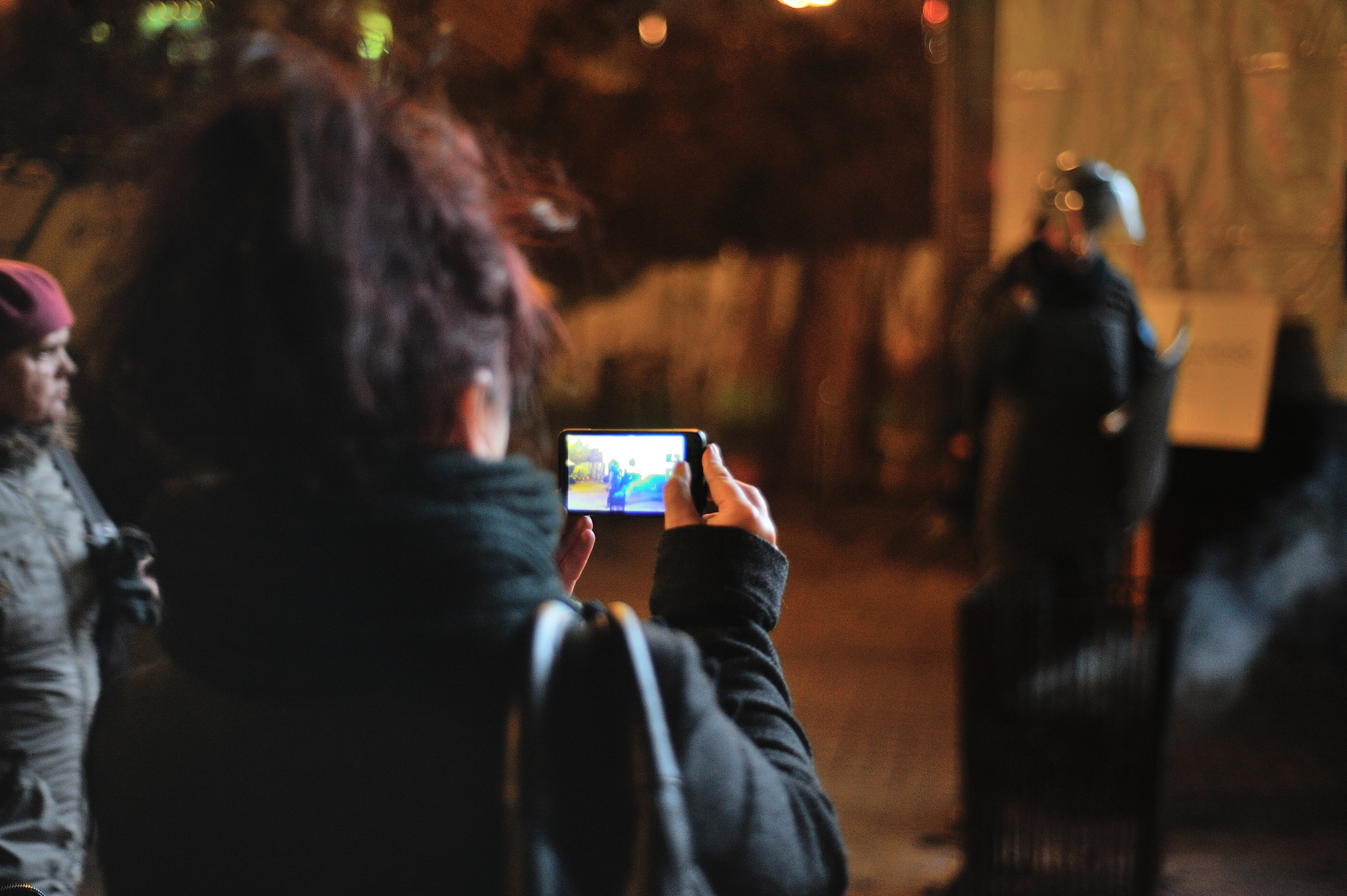
Person using a smartphone to take photographs

Citizen journalism increased during the last decade of the twentieth century and into the twenty-first century, associated with the creation of the internet which introduced new ways in communicating and engaging news. In 2004 Leonard Witt wrote in the National Civic Review, "the voices of a range of citizens are being heard loud and clear on the Internet, mostly through Weblogs." Due to this shift in technology, individuals were able to access more news than previously and at a much faster rate. This larger quantity also made it so there was a larger variety of sources which people were able to consume media and news.

Citizen journalism has proven itself to be an effective form of current event coverage and can possibly signify a shift in modern media. Citizen journalism has been expanding in different varieties of modern media which include, international news, more democratic journalism, mainstream media, and the importance for mass media outlets. Citizen journalism is now one of the main contributors of mainstream news and consistently feeding in information that even traditional journalist can't grasp their hands on. This could eventually lead to citizen journalism to become one of the main sources for news everywhere as the internet and constant information being provided by citizen journalist are key factors contributing to citizen journalism increasing.

Natalie Fenton discusses the role of citizen journalism within the digital age and has three characteristics associated with the topic: speed and space, multiplicity and poly-centrality, and interactivity and participation.

=== Current instances of citizen journalism ===
Citizen journalism has become a recent topic of discussion regarding its efficacy in documenting the downfall of popular cryptocurrency exchange FTX and its founder Sam Bankman-Fried. This recent instance of popular media relying on citizen journalism marks the ever-expanding development of the pseudo-reporting strategy. There is a measurable decrease in interest in traditional news sources as more become disinterested by apparent bias and political influence. Utilizing popular video-sharing platforms such as YouTube, expanded the concept of citizen journalism. This allowed individuals to upload and share content with a more global audience. This platform became instrumental during events like Arab Spring where people documented protests and government responses.

Dan Gillmor, the former technology columnist for the San Jose Mercury News, founded a nonprofit, the Center for Citizen Media, (2005–2009) to help promote it.

Professor Charles Nesson, William F. Weld Professor of Law at Harvard Law School and the founder of the Berkman Center for Internet & Society, chairs the advisory board for Jamaican citizen journalism startup On the Ground News Reports.

Maurice Ali founded one of the first international citizen journalist associations, the International Association of Independent Journalists Inc. (IAIJ), in 2003. The association through its President (Maurice Ali) published studies and articles on citizen journalism, attended and spoken at UNESCO and United Nations events such as a speech in General Assembly at the WSIS+10 meetings that finally recognized internationally, "citizen journalists" as "journalists" with protections, by majority vote of member nations and announced in the final UN Resolution of WSIS+10 (sections 44/45 of that document).

Elon Musk advocates for citizen journalism, urging X (formerly Twitter) users to share real-time text and video updates on unfolding events. He believes that citizen journalism is the future of journalism and that it can enhance transparency and democratize information dissemination.

Public historians have long understood the value of oral history; scholars in adjacent fields now recognize a wider array of community-generated materials as foundational sources for their research and storytelling. The Community-Driven Archives Project at the University of North Carolina-Chapel Hill, an Andrew W. Mellon Foundation-funded initiative, is one such example.

Dan Shurley's article "Philadelphia's Forgotten Forebears: How Pennsylvania Erased the Lenape from Local History" for Hidden City Philadelphia, an independently-produced example of first-person reportage drawing on Indigenous oral histories, has been cited in Afterlives of the American Revolution: Insurgent Remains (Spring Nature, 2024) to ground the scholar's argument that important historic sites in Philadelphia continue to omit or distort Indigenous and Black history. The article informs the work of local librarians and teacher: it is listed in a resource guide on Indigenous People of Philadelphia, prepared by the American Library Association, and the Teachers Institute of Philadelphia, respectively, as resources for understanding the cultural heritage of the region from the perspective of marginalized communities whose stories have been passed outside of mainstream institutions.

- Wikinews - a sister project of Wikipedia dedicated to open source journalism
- Cherry picking – Fallacy of incomplete evidence
- Conjecture – Proposition in mathematics that is unproven
- Democratic journalism
- Global Voices Online
- Independent Media Center
- Meporter – Citizen journalist application to create hyperlocal, real-time news
- Open-source journalism
