= WikiTribune =

For-profit, user-curated news website

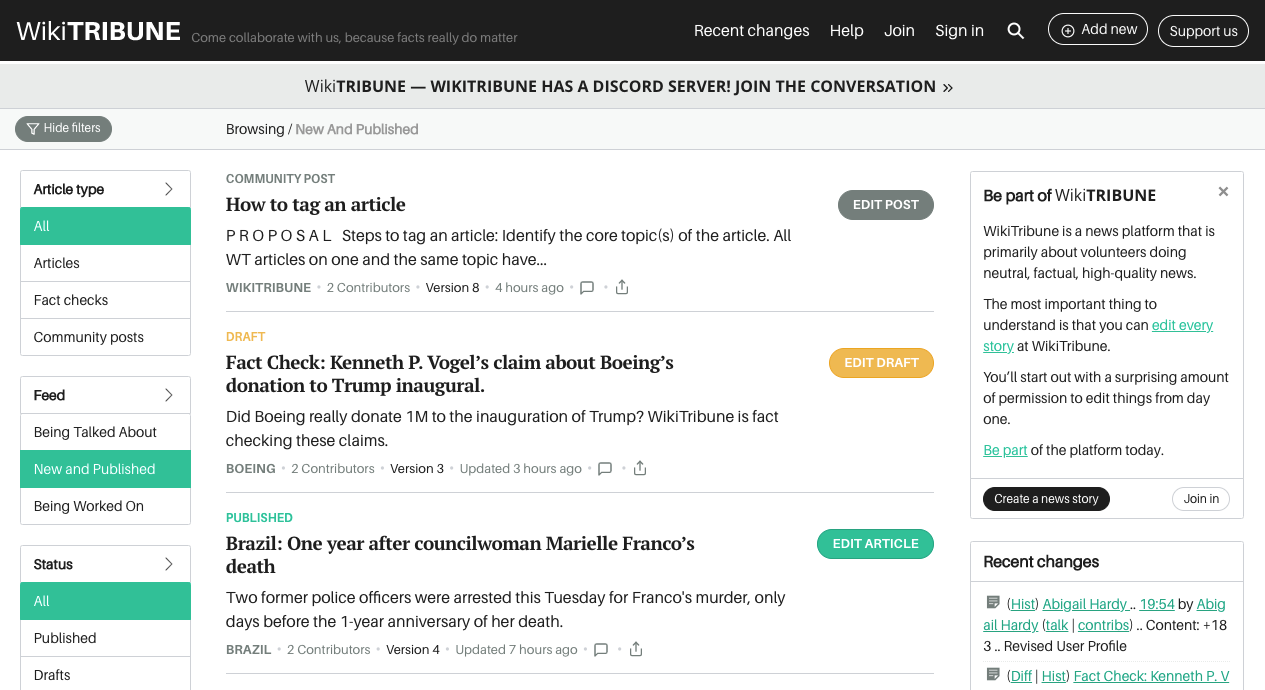
- The Wikitribune homepage in March 2019
- Website type: News
- Available in: English and Spanish
- Headquarters: London
- Owner: Jimmy Wales
- Website: wikitribune.com (Later redirected to WT.Social then TrustCafe.io)
- Commercial: Yes
- Registration: Optional
- Launched: 30 October 2017; 9 years ago
- Content licence: Creative Commons Attribution

WikiTribune (stylized as WikiTRIBUNE) was a news wiki where volunteers wrote and curated articles about widely publicised news by proof-reading, fact-checking, suggesting possible changes, and adding sources from other, usually long established outlets. Jimmy Wales, co-founder of Wikipedia, announced the site in April 2017 as a for-profit site, not affiliated with Wikipedia or its support organisation, the Wikimedia Foundation. Until October 2018, WikiTribune employed journalists with established backgrounds in the profession who researched, syndicated, and reported news. Its website is now a redirect to WT Social.

== History ==
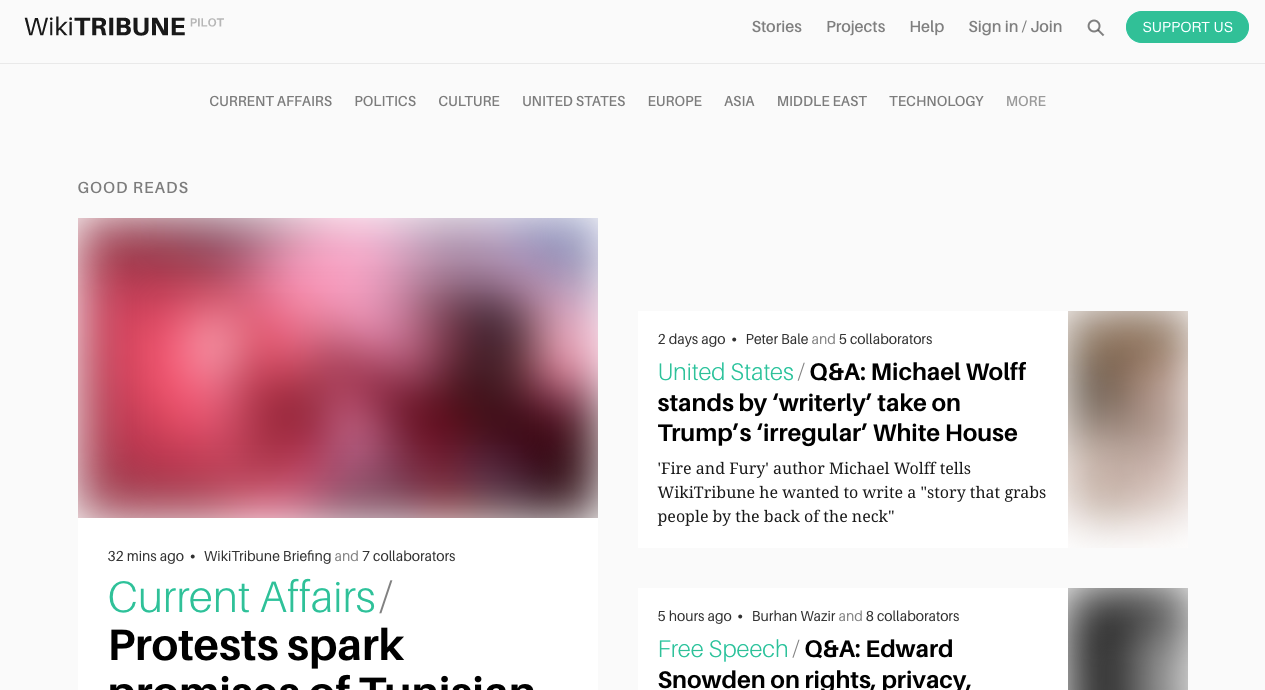
A screenshot of the site in January 2018

WikiTribune was founded by Jimmy Wales and Orit Kopel. Initial crowdfunding for the site was completed in May 2017, raising over £137,000, as well as around £400,000 from donors such as Google, Craig Newmark and the News Integrity Initiative. In August 2017, Peter Bale was named as the first editor of the site on their temporary publishing platform at Medium.com. This was followed by a teaser article posted to Medium in September.

The site opened to the public in October 2017, with a focus on "political, business and economic news, bolstered by weekly in-depth articles". In April 2018, WikiTribune reported losses of over £110,000. Traffic to the website was low. A year later, WikiTribune laid off its team of reporters and editors, after which volunteers could publish articles without having them checked by professionals. "Despite the best efforts of staff, the overall structure and design didn't let the community genuinely flourish," said founder Jimmy Wales. "We didn't get very much work done."

In October 2019, WikiTribune Social, now called WT.Social, was launched. It was announced by Jimmy Wales as a social network. In November 2019, the WikiTribune website became a redirect to WT.Social.

== Business model ==
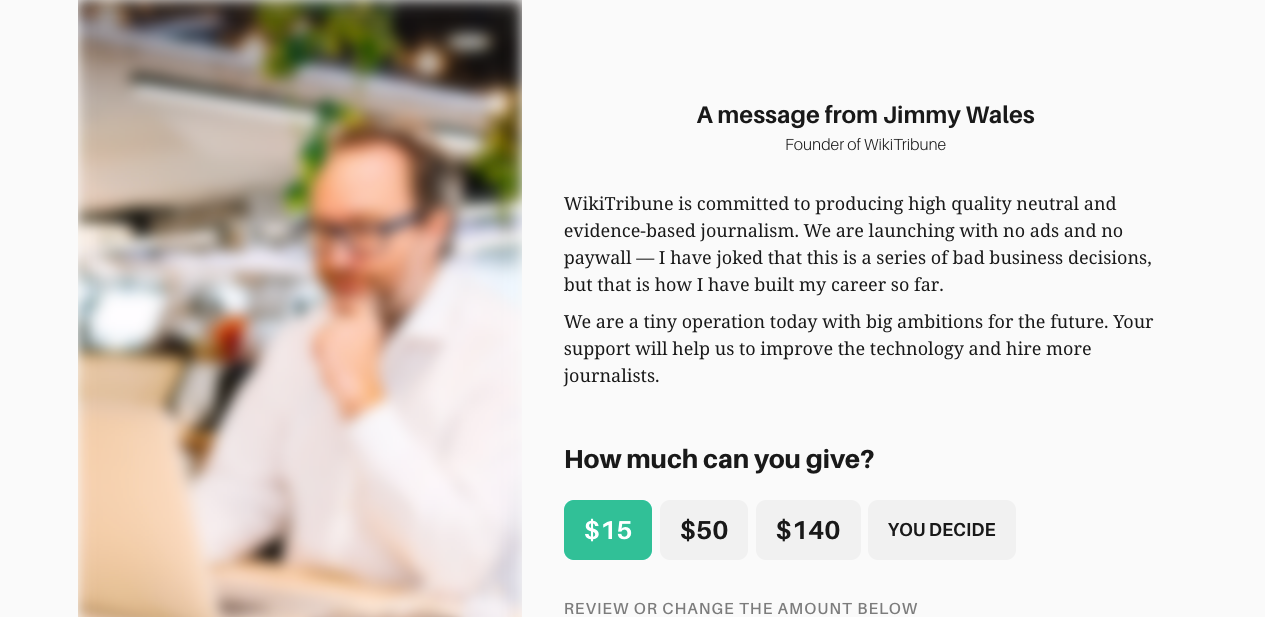
A screenshot of the site's donate page in January 2018

WikiTribune was a for-profit site funded by donors, including donations by readers. Crowdfunding opened in April 2017 and concluded in May. Supporters were asked to pay £10 or $15 per month, but access to the news was free. It was stated that having no shareholders, advertisers or subscribers would reduce commercial pressures. Supporters who donated to the site were able to help decide which subjects the site would focus on.

Reporting journalists had to provide the source of a fact or provide full transcripts and recordings of their interviews. The public was able to modify and update articles; however, such updates only went live after approval by staff or trusted volunteers.

"This will be the first time that professional journalists and citizen journalists will work side-by-side as equals writing stories as they happen, editing them live as they develop and at all times backed by a community checking and rechecking all facts", said Wales. Wales intended for the project to help fight fake news online; he was reportedly motivated to address this problem after hearing the Counselor to the U.S. president, Kellyanne Conway, use the expression 'alternative facts' during an interview in January 2017.

== Staff and structure ==
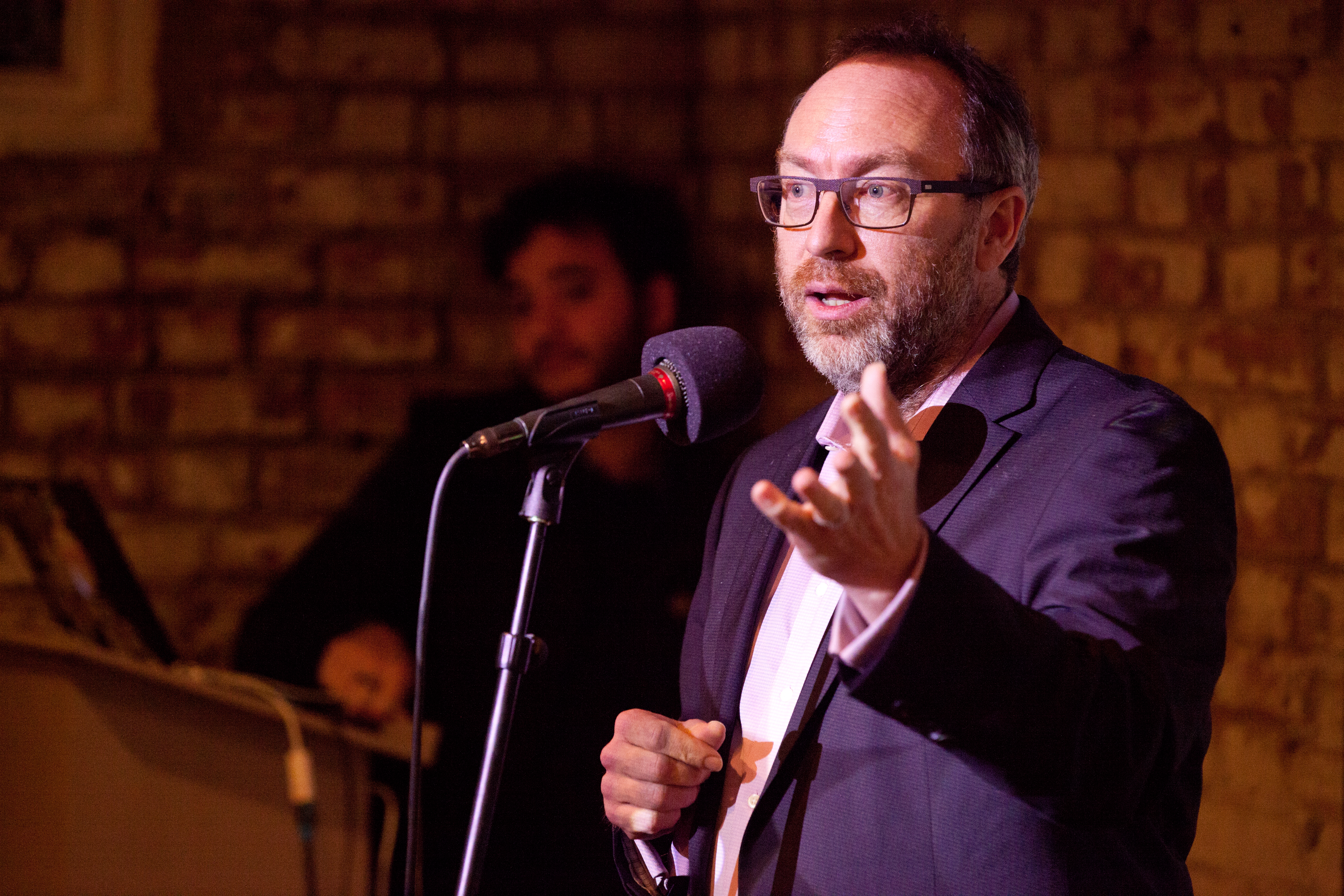
The venture was launched by Jimmy Wales, who has a "hands-on" role with the site as chief executive.

WikiTribune was based in an office space on the 22nd floor of The Shard in London. The initial software platform for the site was a customised version of WordPress. Wales' company Jimmy Group, which he incorporated earlier in April 2017, filed a trademark request for "WIKITRIBUNE" with the Intellectual Property Office, which was examining the request in April 2017.

People named as involved in the project as advisors to Wales included Lily Cole, Jeff Jarvis, Guy Kawasaki, and Lawrence Lessig. Funding for seven of the ten planned journalists was secured within three weeks of the launch and they were then recruited, starting with Holly Brockwell. The initial target of funding for ten journalists was then achieved in the crowd-funding appeal. An additional $100,000 of matching support from Craig Newmark's News Integrity Initiative was also expected.

In a Medium post published in May 2017, WikiTribune said it had met its funding goal, but would not start operations until later that year:

Despite lots of confused comments, the end of the crowdfunding campaign doesn't mean an instantaneous launch. It means we've got enough support to start making the project happen, which involves hiring for, designing and building WikiTribune from scratch. ... We don’t have an exact date, but we're aiming to be up and running – that means producing content – by Autumn this year. We’ll do it faster if we can, but only if we can do it right.

In a Medium post published in July 2017, WikiTribune introduced three of their initial ten journalists as Holly Brockwell, Harry Ridgewell, and Linh Nguyen.

On 23 October 2018, The Times reported that WikiTribune had laid off its team of reporters and editors, "a year after it launched with a promise to reinvent journalism." Volunteers could then publish articles without having them checked by professionals, although a new team of journalists purportedly was to be hired to work in support roles. "Despite the best efforts of staff, the overall structure and design didn't let the community genuinely flourish," said founder Jimmy Wales. "We didn't get very much work done." Funded by donations rather than advertisers, the site remained free to access.

== Reception ==
Adrienne LaFrance reviewed the WikiTribune proposal in The Atlantic. She had previously worked at the Honolulu Civil Beat, which was founded by Pierre Omidyar with similar ideas of "peer news". LaFrance thought the plan was over-ambitious as a staff of ten was insufficient to cover global news stories and managing volunteer input would be time-consuming.

Andrew Lih, a researcher at the American University's school of communication, expected WikiTribune's hybrid approach to be more successful than the volunteer-only model of Wikinews: "You have an operational command structure that’s based on full-time staff. The pro journalists and editors provide the supervision on how the story moves forward. The crowd does the heavy lifting on a lot of the combing, sifting, searching, checking. You let the crowd do what the crowd is good at."

Sarah Baxter, deputy editor of the Sunday Times, addressed WikiTribune in the newspaper in April 2017 in "Wikipedia won't break real news, just tweak it". After critical remarks on the reliability of Wikipedia, she said: "It's the warp and weft of debate in the free press, whether digital or print, that gets to the heart of the truth, not the wacky wisdom of self-appointed crowds."

Emily Bell, director of the Tow Center for Digital Journalism, reviewed coverage of the project four days after the initial announcement. She said that there was considerable scepticism which was apparent in an Ask Me Anything session held by Wales. She thought that WikiTribune would duplicate work which was already being done and gave examples such as David Fahrenthold's Pulitzer prize-winning coverage of the United States presidential election for the Washington Post, during which he used Twitter to engage with the public.

Zahera Harb, a lecturer in journalism at City University of London, questioned the site's reliance on unpaid volunteers, saying, "I see a model closer to 'exploitation' than anything else." She also wrote that the site would be susceptible to error and bias: "In this system, we will encounter mistakes similar to those we have been seeing in Wikipedia. Those mistakes tend to cause the same harm as fake news. ... Meddling with Wikipedia accounts has become a tool in media wars between political and economic rivals and also between countries that are in conflict over territory or that have conflicting historical narratives."

Staff at a media law firm, Hogan Lovells, speculated whether the proposed collaborative model of journalism would provide sufficient protection against the English Defamation Act 2013 and concluded that the matter was not certain in law and so would depend upon the outcome of future court actions.

WikiTribune has been compared to CORRECT!V, a non-profit investigative journalism centre in Germany; De Correspondent, a Dutch news site financed by crowd-funding and charities; and Krautreporter, a German news website supported by crowd-funding.

According to The Times, the site's first "taster" article, published in September 2017, "prompted such derision from supporters that some cancelled their monthly donations in protest"; readers reportedly complained that the article "was littered with factual errors and incomprehensible sentences" and seemed to have a pronounced liberal bias.

== See also ==
- Wikinews
- Crowdfunded journalism
- Open-source journalism
- Wiki journalism
- PediaPress
