= History Commons =

History website and organization

- Founded: 2001
- Founder: Derek Mitchell, Michael Bevin
- Type: 501(c)(3)
- Tax ID no.: 20-5530331
- Registration no.: C2842250
- Location: Santa Cruz, California, U.S.
- Owner: Center for Grassroots Oversight, Inc.
- Website: www.historycommons.org
- Formerly called: Center for Cooperative Research

The History Commons is a website and organization that documents events and issues of great social and political significance via detailed timelines. The History Commons operates under a Creative Commons Attribution-Noncommercial-ShareAlike license. It was originally sponsored by The Global Center, a 501(c)(3) organization, and is now operated by the Center for Grassroots Oversight, itself a 501(c)3 organization. The website was previously named Center for Cooperative Research, and was located at cooperativeresearch.org. On November 11, 2022, it was reported that the original site was offline "indefinitely" and that "funding and expertise is needed for a site rebuild."

== Nature and purpose ==
According to the History Commons "About" page, the purpose of the website is: "To provide a means for members of civil society to monitor the activities of powerful entities, such as governments, large corporations, and wealthy and influential individuals." And: "The Web site is a tool for open-content participatory journalism. It allows people to investigate important issues by providing a space where people can collaborate on the documentation of past and current events, as well as the entities associated with those events. The Web site can be used to investigate topics at the local, regional, or global level. The data is displayed on the Web site in the form of dynamic timelines and entity profiles, and is exportable into XML so it can be shared with others for non-commercial purposes." However, the data export feature was non-functional as of April 2008 and has not been fixed since. A "Conceptual Summary" posted on the History Commons blog elaborates on this theme:

The History Commons is a free and open space where you can collaborate with others to chronicle history, monitor powerful private interests, and conduct oversight of governments. ... The History Commons ... is people-powered and people-driven, as opposed to being driven by powerful entities that represent a very narrow band of society. Contributors to HC work together to build an online documented version of the historical record. It is a socially and politically significant exercise because it has the potential to create a version of the historical narrative that is written by a wider swath of society, and therefore serves a broader scope of interests. It is a narrative that is less subject to control by the dominant sectors of society. Contributors participate for a variety of reasons. In most cases they are people who have an acute interest in politics and who have a perspective on history and current events that is in conflict with the narrative that is broadcast by powerful interests such as governments and the major media networks. They write because they want to create a written record of alternative narratives that checks the power of these interests. This is a key element of the History Commons' 'people-driven' nature, where the diverse contributions of its users make it possible to produce a record that transcends particular ideological and social agendas.

Timelines are the main feature and research tool of the website: 32 timelines have been published as of June 2012, profiling more than 19,700 events and more than 18,000 entities, e.g. individuals, governments/agencies, businesses and organizations. Other timelines are in the planning and development stage. The term "timeline," though accurate, is something of a misnomer. The content (dated summaries of events) is organized into chronological timelines, but the term "project" is somewhat more descriptive as many timelines/projects have a broad scope due to the complexity of the topic focus, and consist of multiple, subsidiary, cross-referenced timelines. The homepage of each project displays a table of contents, with links to subsidiary timelines and actual individual entries. The timelines are dynamic: By clicking on the title of an event summary, a "scalable context timeline" is produced, the scope of which can be narrowed or broadened depending on the proximity of other events or entities in relation to that particular event summary. Timelines can also be rendered by clicking on reference links or tags in an event summary, or by searching names, keywords or dates; this returns a timeline including the relevant event summaries. Each event summary cites at least one authoritative source, e.g. governments, organizations, mainstream media, scholars, investigative journalists and other recognized experts. All projects are works in progress; the goal is to provide the most current, comprehensive and detailed overview of each project's subject, and the related time periods, events and entities.

Project content is written, edited, and posted by independent volunteer contributors who are responsible for their work. In July 2008, History Commons project manager Michael Tuck wrote in an article for Nieman Watchdog, "Contributors own their content; the Commons provides a searchable information base where disparate material can be brought together in a single repository." Like Wikipedia, the History Commons is a database that the public can edit and add content to. Some important differences are that the ability to do so is limited to registered users, and that entries/edits go through an editorial peer-review process before being published. According to a History Commons "Conceptual Summary",

There are three steps to the review process. After an entry is submitted, it is reviewed for content to ensure that it is well-written and well-sourced. Sources are checked to ensure that what is in the entry accurately reflects the source material without resorting to plagiarism. An entry approved for content is then submitted for copyediting, using the HC style manual as a guide. If the event is rejected during the first step, it is sent back to the user, who reads over the comments and then resubmits the entry. If it is approved, another user, who is in charge of managing the user-defined timeline that the event was submitted to, then makes a decision whether or not the verified event should be added to the timeline. Each event is thoroughly reviewed for accuracy and proper grammar and spelling.

== Featured timelines ==
The "Timelines" page lists the projects that have been published; there are 32 as of June 2012. These include projects on the current global economic crisis, the US wars in Afghanistan and Iraq, US prisoner abuse and torture, the loss of US civil liberties, the September 11 attacks, domestic propaganda in America, global warming, US health care issues, US electoral politics, Kosovar Albanian self-determination, and many others.

== History ==
The History Commons website was originally developed and operated by the now-defunct Center for Cooperative Research (CCR), which was founded in 2001 by Derek Mitchell, a California-based social entrepreneur. Along with software developer Michael Bevin, Mitchell helped develop the History Commons web application after it became apparent that a static HTML-based Web site was not enough to manage its rapidly expanding content. In June 2002, environmental activist Paul Thompson joined CCR, bringing with him a copious amount of research on the September 11 attacks. Thompson eventually used the material he contributed to the website for his 2004 book, The Terror Timeline. Due to the quality of the research, Thompson was invited by Rep. Cynthia McKinney to testify at a Congressional hearing on the failings and flaws of the 9/11 Commission report, and he did so in 2005. Mitchell, Thompson, and other researchers steadily expanded the website's projects and timelines. In 2007, the Center for Grassroots Oversight (CGO) took over operation of the website, renaming it to the History Commons. The current version of the History Commons Web application is written in Java and runs on Apache Tomcat. The data is stored in a MySQL database accessed through JDO. The presentation layer is done in JSP using a templating system called Bricks."

== Features ==
=== Users ===
Users of the History Commons can read through the 33 major projects listed on the Timelines page, or any of the subsidiary timelines listed in each project's table of contents. The History Commons Web application can also create dynamic timelines by clicking on an event summary title or tag, or by searching a keyword or entity name. The History Commons Web application also generates a "context timeline" based on a particular event, which shows the summary for that event along with associated summaries describing similar or related events. Context timelines are scalable, so a user can focus his or her search as narrowly or as widely as desired. The History Commons Conceptual Summary states: "[T]he user is able to conduct a finely tuned search for specific information regarding a specific entity or event, or can launch a more broad-based search for information of wider interest."

=== Contributors ===
Those choosing to contribute material can begin contributing by creating an account with the History Commons and then submitting specific entries on a topic of their choice. Each submitted entry is required to have at least one source, usually a news article, a government or non-governmental organization document, or a book, and is peer-reviewed by other contributors and project managers before being published to the database for public viewing. The site provides a detailed style manual and a walkthrough tutorial to aid prospective contributors.

== Commentary on the website ==
Numerous individuals have given feedback on the History Commons, often praising it for its uniqueness and usefulness.

In October 2010, Salon commentator Glenn Greenwald called the History Commons's Watergate project a "richly documented summary of those events."

In a 2009 e-mail to the site, author Philip Shenon, a veteran New York Times reporter and author of The Commission, a book about the 9/11 Commission, wrote: "Your timeline has been invaluable to me over the years. I'm certainly aware of - and flattered by - your citations from my book."

Craig Unger, author of House of Bush, House of Saud and The Fall of the House of Bush, wrote: "For serious research, it's hard to think of a more valuable resource than the timelines assembled by History Commons. The material they provide is a welcome antidote to the misinformation and disinformation that has been coming out of Washington in recent years and they are essential tools in assembling a counter-narrative that more honestly addresses the crises we face." In his acknowledgements to House of Bush, House of Saud, Unger wrote: "The Center for Cooperative Research is another valuable Internet tool. Because I made a practice of citing original sources, it does not appear in my notes nearly as often as it might. However, its timelines about 911 and related issues often helped me find exactly what I was looking for. I highly recommend it to anyone doing research on 9/11 and I encourage its support."

Author Peter Lance wrote, in the acknowledgements of his book Cover-Up: "As mentioned throughout, I was blessed in this state of my research with access to Paul Thompson's remarkable timelines from the Center for Cooperative Research ... each citation in that database is supported by a news story from the mainstream media. ... Any research, reporter, or scholar with an interest in the war on terror would consider the Cooperative Research timelines a bonanza of open source information."

Investigative journalist and author James Ridgeway wrote for the Village Voice in April 2004: "Paul Thompson ... is one of a handful of freelance, unpaid, amateur sleuths who have become a 9/11 Information Central—what amounts to an intelligence apparatus aimed at pinning down what the Bush administration knew and didn't know about 9/11, before and after the attacks. The results of this sleuthing often find their way to the 9/11 families, and in particular, to the by now mythic Jersey Girls, as the leaders of the survivors' families have come to be called. The researchers are in many ways similar to the team Scott Armstrong, the former Washington Post reporter, recruited in the mid 1980s to uncover the roots of Reagan's secret Iran-Contra deals. ... At the hub of the 9-11 research is [Paul] Thompson's intricate timeline. ... Still other timelines delve into official 'lies' from 1979 forward. ... [Derek] Mitchell's aim is to keep the entries as neutrally written and as well sourced as he can." In his 2005 book, The Five Unanswered Questions of 9/11, Ridgeway referred to Thompson's book, The Terror Timeline, as "still the most comprehensive summary of the events related to the 9/11 attacks." At that time, the book contained only a significant fraction of the total amount of information contained in The Complete 9/11 Timeline at CooperativeResearch.org, and a great deal of material has since been added.

New York Magazine correspondent Mark Jacobson wrote in 2006, "[The History Commons'] 9/11 timeline has become the undisputed gold standard of truth research ..."

Minneapolis City Pages reporter Steve Perry wrote in 2003 that the History Commons is "endlessly informative."

Daniel Erlacher, the director of Austria's Elevate Festival, wrote in an e-mail to the site:

The History Commons is one of the most important and technologically advanced projects of civil journalism there is today. The website of the project is an enormous resource for researchers. Because of the excellent possibilities to tag entities and to group them in timetables, people can easily read and filter information, which is usually presented out of context. The History Commons is a project which helps connect the dots and sheds light on several inconsistencies in official narratives of some of the most important stories of our time. The Elevate Festival was very proud to present the project for the first time in Europe in 2008 and we will continue to support it.

Matthew Hurst wrote on his Data Mining blog in 2008: "The site is a cooperative approach to history and presents data in timelines. ... I like this vertical approach to wiki data as it has the potential to focus both expertise and data structures, making the data more valuable in a number of dimensions."

Author David Ray Griffin wrote in the acknowledgements of his book The New Pearl Harbor Revisited

In acknowledging the tremendous amount of help and support I received in writing this book, I wish to begin by mentioning the indispensable source for 9/11-related stories published in the mainstream press: The Complete 9/11 Timeline at History Commons (formerly known as Cooperative Research). ... [I]t has surely become, through the continuing work of [Paul] Thompson and his colleagues, the greatest feat of annotated, investigative journal indexing ever achieved on a volunteer basis. Having served as the source of about half of my references in The New Pearl Harbor, this timeline has been equally indispensable for The New Pearl Harbor Revisited.

Matthew Phelan, in a column for Gawker on NSA misuse of authorities, referred to factual information about significant entities and events being "dutifully logged at places like History Commons where ... people like to go to collaboratively try and figure out what the hell is going on, post-9/11."

== See also ==
- Citizen journalism
- Collaborative journalism
