= Paul Bradshaw (journalist) =

British online journalist, blogger and journalism academic

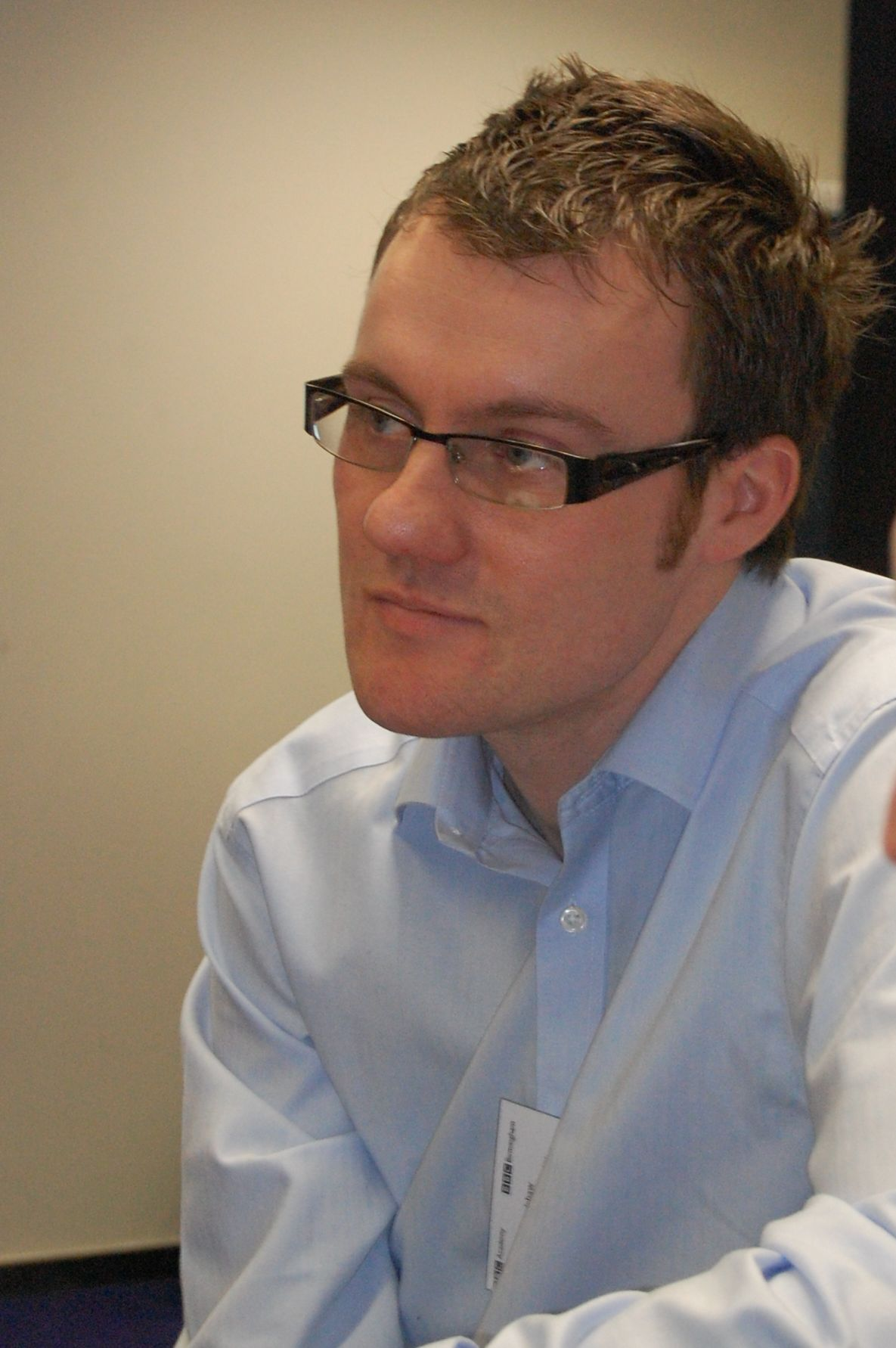
- Bradshaw in January 2013
- Born: Bolton
- Education: University of Central England
- Occupations: Journalist, Blogger; Academic
- Employers: Birmingham City University; City University London; BBC
- Website: onlinejournalismblog.com

Professor Paul Bradshaw is an online journalist and blogger, who leads the MA in Data Journalism at Birmingham City University. He manages his own blog, the Online Journalism Blog (OJB), and was the co-founder of Help Me Investigate, an investigative journalism website funded by Channel 4 and Screen WM. He has written for journalism.co.uk, Press Gazette, The Guardian's Data Blog, Nieman Reports and the Poynter Institute in the US. From 2010 to 2015 he was also a visiting professor at City University's School of Journalism in London. From 2015 to 2020 he worked with the BBC England data unit and since 2020 he has worked with the BBC Shared Data Unit.

Bradshaw is the author of the Online Journalism Handbook, and co-author with Steve Hill of Mobile-First Journalism. He also co-wrote the 3rd edition of Magazine Editing with John Morrish. He has self-published a number of ebooks on data journalism and Snapchat and contributed to books including Investigative Journalism (2nd Ed), Web Journalism: A New Form of Citizenship; Face the Future; Citizen Journalism: Global Perspectives; Specialist Reporting; Data Journalism: Mapping the Future; and Ethics for Digital Journalists: Emerging Best Practices.

Adrian Monck ranked Bradshaw second in his list of "Britain's Top Ten Journo-Bloggers" (2007). He was placed thirty-sixth in the Birmingham Post's "Power 50" list of 2009 and listed again in the Media section of the 'Power 250' list in 2016. He has been listed in Journalism.co.uk's list of the leading innovators in journalism and media and Poynter's most influential people in social media.

In 2010 he was shortlisted for Multimedia Publisher of the Year and in 2011 ranked 9th in PeerIndex's list of the most influential UK journalists on Twitter. In 2016 he was part of a team that won the CNN MultiChoice African Journalist Awards.

Bradshaw is also a graduate of Birmingham City University (then the University of Central England), where he studied media from 1995 to 1998.

One of Bradshaw's MA students was Lyra McKee.

== See also ==
- Wiki journalism
