= De Correspondent =

Dutch news website

- Available in: Dutch, English (partly)
- Owner: De Correspondent B.V.
- Editor: Rob Wijnberg
- Website: DeCorrespondent.nl
- Commercial: Yes
- Registration: Required
- Users: 60,000
- Launched: 30 September 2013
- Current status: Online

De Correspondent is a Dutch news website based in Amsterdam, Netherlands. It was launched on 30 September 2013 after raising more than €1 million in a crowdfunding campaign in eight days. The website distinguishes itself by rejecting the daily news cycle and focusing on in-depth and chronological coverage on a topical basis, led by individual correspondents who each focus on specific topics. Sometimes it publishes English versions of its articles.

The concept and initial success of De Correspondent has inspired other projects elsewhere. A German website Krautreporter was founded in 2014 and adopted the same concept.

An English-language news site, titled The Correspondent, launched on September 30, 2019. The site raised US$2.6 million through a crowdfunding campaign in late 2018, boosted by prominent backers including Jay Rosen and Trevor Noah. However, it endured substantial criticism after it was announced that it would not open an office in the United States, as many backers had anticipated. On 10 December 2020, NiemanLab broke the news that The Correspondent would be closing down on 31 December 2020.

== History ==
The project was co-founded by Dutch journalist Rob Wijnberg, creative director Harald Dunnink, CTO Sebastian Kersten, and publisher Ernst-Jan Pfauth. Wijnberg, former editor-in-chief of the Dutch newspaper NRC Next, proposed the crowdfunding idea for an ad-free news media platform on national television in March 2013. Eight days later, he and his team reached their goal of 15,000 subscribers all paying €60 for a one-year membership. Wijnberg worked with digital creative agency Momkai and its owners, Harald Dunnink and Sebastian Kersten, served as creative director and CTO respectively. Ernst-Jan Pfauth, who had been the founding editor of The Next Web and head of digital at Dutch newspaper NRC Handelsblad, joined as a publisher.

The website went live in September 2013. By January 2015 the website had more than 45,000 paying subscribers. In January 2016 the number of paying subscribers on the website was reported to be 50,000.

In 2014, De Correspondent concluded a deal with Medium’s magazine Matter, for the magazine to translate stories from De Correspondent that they believe are relevant for an international audience. The first article in the partnership concerned the hazards of using public Wi-Fi.

In 2015, De Correspondent started translating stories from Dutch to English.

In December 2018, an English-language newsroom, The Correspondent, reached its crowdfunding goal of US$2.5 million. The crowdfunding was enabled by a US$1.8 million "runway funding" by grants and loans from the Omidyar Network, the Dutch Democracy and Media Foundation, and Craig Newmark Philanthropies. Its first news stories were published in September 2019.

On 31 December 2020, The Correspondent was shut down. Pfauth and Wijnberg noted that the platform was no longer financially viable due to two primary reasons: poor conversion and retention of members, especially with only 27% of founding members renewed for the 2021 fiscal year, as well as readers' demand for more immediate news in light of the COVID-19 pandemic that ran contrary to the outlet's concept of "unbreaking news".

In February 2026, the entire editorial board, consisting of the editor-in-chief and the two deputy editors, announced that they would be stepping down in order to have more time to write articles.

== Content ==
The website aims to move away from the daily news cycle by focusing on context, rather than what happened in the past 24 hours. Individual correspondents lead as "guides" — deciding the news agenda and making their choices explicit. De Correspondent intends its authors to report on under-reported themes including energy, privacy, technology, and future economic trends.

== Technology ==
De Correspondent runs on a content management system (CMS) called Respondens. In several blog posts, the founders said that they might make Respondens available for other publishers in the future.

== Criticism ==
At least one incident involving editorial integrity was pointed out by Sarah Kendzior, a political journalist and one-time correspondent for De Correspondent. In 2018, Kendzior expressed concern on Twitter that an editor at De Correspondent was refusing to review her draft articles due to climate change denial. The outlet denied these allegations in a public letter on Twitter, as well as an accusation that they deleted Kendzior's articles as retaliation. However, Kendzior replied that their responses "grossly misrepresent" the "deep disagreement" behind this conflict.

The fundraising campaign for The Correspondent featured endorsements from political celebrities primarily based in the United States, including Jimmy Wales, DeRay McKesson, and Rosanne Cash. As such, crowdfunding supporters as well as "ambassadors" including Baratunde Thurston and Nate Silver noted an expectation that The Correspondent will launch as an outlet specifically focused on the United States. However, a progress update from the platform in April 2019 revealed that the platform did not intend to build a physical presence in the United States. Zainab Shah, a former strategy leader of BuzzFeed who resigned from The Correspondent a month prior, claimed that the platform's decisions "was a betrayal" and criticized the fundraising drive for operating under a "false pretense".

The outlet tweeted on April 30, 2019 an unsigned letter that apologized for having "screwed up" its public launch. In it, The Correspondent noted that they "initially envisioned setting up a newsroom in the US" but "poorly communicated" changes in that vision to supporters and staff, and falsely represented the platform's vision as an American version of De Correspondent.

== See also ==
- Crowdfunded journalism
- Open-source journalism
- Scientific journalism
- Wiki journalism
- WikiTribune
