= Frons (disambiguation) =

The Frons is the front part of the head capsule in many insects.

Frons may also refer to:

- Latin for forehead
- Brian Frons (born 1956), American television executive and former president of ABC Daytime
- Marc Frons, former chief technology officer of News Corp

== See also ==
- Scaenae frons, the permanent architectural background of a Roman theatre stage
- Fron (disambiguation)
