= Collaborative journalism =

Practice where multiple news organizations work together

Collaborative journalism is a growing practice in the field of journalism. One definition is "a cooperative arrangement (formal or informal) between two or more news and information organizations, which aims to supplement each organization's resources and maximize the impact of the content produced." It is practiced by both professional and amateur reporters. It is not to be confused with citizen journalism.

== Further definition ==
Collaborative journalism can take many forms. One way to categorize collaborations is by duration (either temporary or ongoing), or by the level of integration among collaborators (from no integration to top-level organizational integration). Most collaborations can be placed within a matrix defined by these two variables, as here:

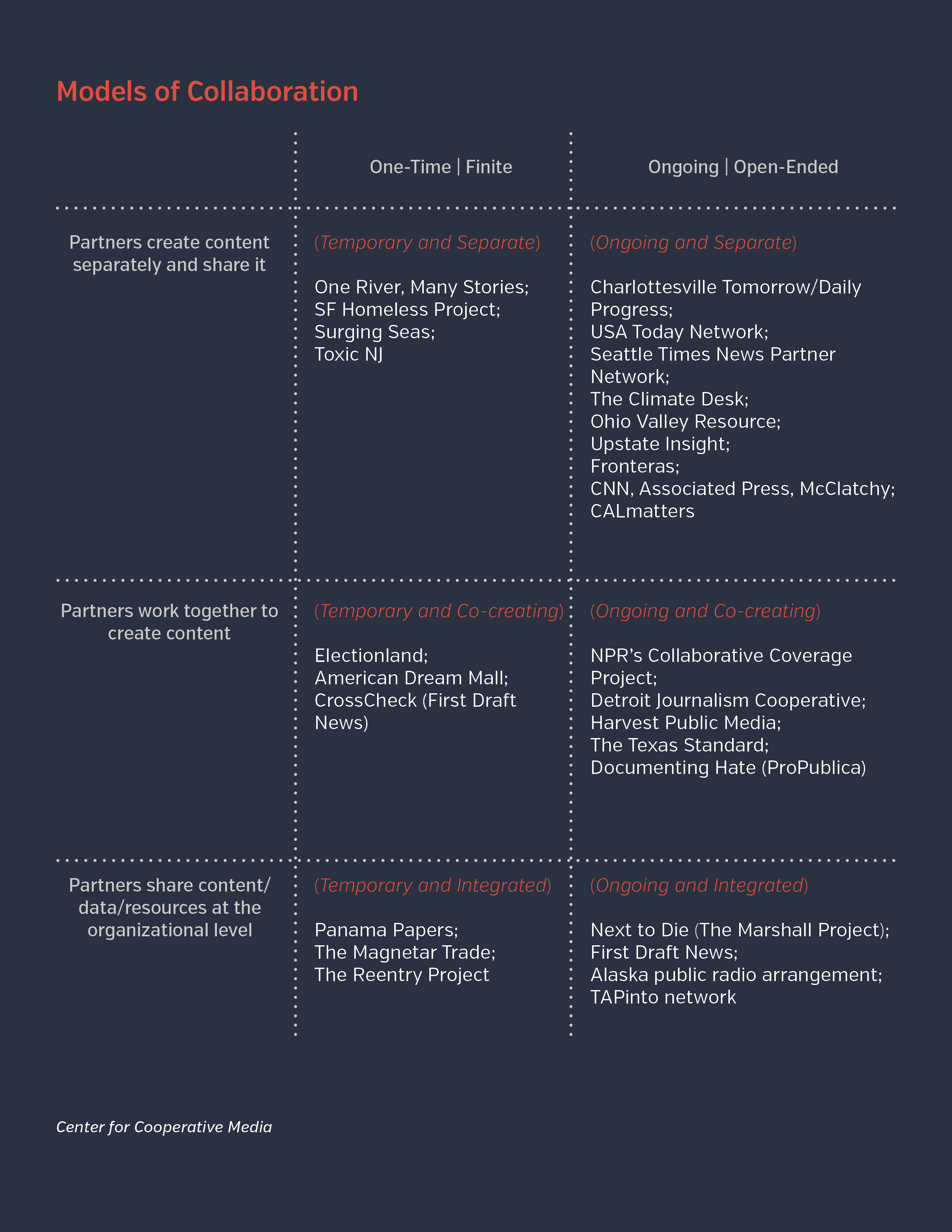
Categorization matrix from the Center for Cooperative Media

Depending on the system of collaboration, individuals may also provide feedback or vote on whether an article is newsworthy. A single collaborative news story, therefore, may encompass multiple authors, varying articles, and ranged perspectives.

Professional and amateur reporters may work together to develop collaborative news articles, or mainstream media sites may gather amateur blog posts to complement reporting.

Collaborative journalists either contribute directly to stories, sometimes through a wiki-style collaboration platform, or build upon the story externally, often through personal blogs. Through combined authorship, collaborative journalism is thought by some to offer an increased independence of thought and experience unavailable to traditional media.

Successful collaborative journalism projects require a participatory ethos with respect for content.

== History ==
Collaboration among reporters or between newsrooms has been practiced in different forms for more than one hundred years. One of the earliest journalism collaborations was among the newsrooms that made up “the wires” in the mid-nineteenth century.

Through most of the twentieth century, especially after the advent of the penny papers, competition between outlets was the norm. But even during the height of profitability in the late twentieth century, when competition – not collaboration – was the most salient relationship between newsrooms, it was common practice for journalists on the same beat to collaborate by sharing notes, swapping tips, and helping each other out in general. Formal collaboration during that period was most common among individuals or departments within a single organization, rather than between separate organizations. For example, Cable News Network (CNN) was formed in 1980, and codified intra-newsroom sharing – between the national headquarters and its television news affiliates – with CNN NewsSource in 1988.

However, there is a qualitative difference in the consciousness and intentionality with which collaborations are now being undertaken. The current excitement about collaborative journalism began in the mid-2000s, when publishers, journalism scholars, and foundations began to look at the opportunities made possible by digital networking.

=== Panama Papers ===
The Panama Papers project may be the largest example of a journalistic consortium to date. It began sometime in 2015 when Bastian Obermayer, an investigative reporter with the south German newspaper Süddeutsche Zeitung, was contacted by an anonymous source and offered the trove of 11.5 million electronic documents from Mossack Fonseca, the world's fourth biggest offshore law firm detailing a web of secret offshore deals and loans worth billions of dollars, and details of tax avoidance designs in numerous countries. The newspaper's editors decided they could not handle the massive volume of information alone and initiated a collaborative journalistic consortium including more than 140 journalists and the International Consortium of Investigative Journalists, a project of the nonprofit Center for Public Integrity.

== Football Leaks (2016/2017) ==
The European Investigative Collaborations (EIC) working with "over 60 journalists in 14 countries" published a "series of articles called Football Leaks—the "largest leak in sports history". Football Leaks "led to the prosecution of football superstar Cristiano Ronaldo and coach Jose Mourinho." EIC was established in the fall of 2015 with founding members that include Der Spiegel, El Mundo, Médiapart, the Romanian Centre for Investigative Journalism (CRJI), and Le Soir.

== Differentiation from other styles of journalism ==
- Collaborative journalism should not be confused with citizen journalism, which is practiced only by amateur reporters who develop stories by actively reporting, collecting, analyzing and disseminating news and information, often through blogs on the internet.
- It is not community journalism or civic journalism, which are practiced only by professionals:
  - In community journalism, professional reporters focus their coverage on smaller communities, such as neighborhoods, suburbs, or small towns (rather than national or international coverage.)
  - Civic journalism is the philosophy and practice of professional journalists and newspapers acting as participants within a community, rather than detached spectators.
- Collaborative journalism is similar, but not identical, to interactive journalism, in which consumers contribute to a professional news story through commenting and conversing with the reporter.
- Wiki journalism is a type of collaborative journalism.

== Link journalism ==
"Link journalism", a phrase coined by Scott Karp in 2008, is "a form of collaborative journalism in which a news story's writer provides external links within the story to reporting or other sources on the web." These links are meant to complement, enhance, or add context to the original reporting. Jeff Jarvis, from the Graduate School of Journalism's new media program at the City University of New York, has said that link journalism creates a "new architecture of news."

== Implementation ==
Collaborative journalism has been implemented in several different ways. Wikinews, the "free-content online news source," lets any user edit or create a news story, similar in style to Wikipedia. Several mainstream news sites have adopted a collaborative journalism approach toward news, through use of news aggregation. The Washington Post has developed a political site which links to related content from other news sites. NBC links to local newspapers, radio broadcasts, online videos, and blogs on its local television stations' sites. The sites do not separate articles written by NBC staff and links to outside sources. The New York Times has introduced a Times Extra website feature which acts posts links to outside news sites. Commenting on the launch of Times Extra, Marc Frons, CTO for Digital Operations at the New York Times, said:

“In the past, I think many news organizations were afraid to link to other Web sites out of fear that they might be sending people to an unreliable source or that their readers would never return. But those fears were largely misplaced and we've seen a much more open policy when it comes to pointing readers at useful content elsewhere on the Web."

Other sites exhibit collaborative journalism through aggregation. On the site NewsVine, for example, wire stories from the Associated Press complement user-generated stories and blog posts. Reddit and other news aggregation sites may also act as collaborative journalism sites, depending on where content originates.

== Awards for collaborative journalism ==
Due to the increase in collaborative journalism, several organizations have begun to offer grants or awards for these types of projects. For example, Online Journalism Awards (launched in May 2000) added a new award category for collaborations and partnerships. Clean Energy Wire offers grants for collaborative journalism projects on the topic of energy or the climate. The annual Hostwriter Prize awards money to support pitches and published collaborative projects by journalists.

== Criticism ==
Collaborative journalism has received some criticism:

- Some news stories require secrecy as they develop. Often sources cannot know that they are being investigated or reported on. When a single reporter investigates a person or organization, this secrecy is more likely to be kept. When news stories are developed collaboratively by multiple journalists, however, secrecy is more likely to be lost and the story jeopardized.
- Quality of collaborative projects may be difficult to assess. Fact-checking may be difficult, as facts come from many different sources. Quality of writing and reporting may also differ among contributors.

== See also ==
- Blog
- Citizen journalism
- Crowdsourcing § In journalism
- Democratic journalism
- Independent Media Center
- Interactive journalism
- Media democracy
- New media
- Newsvine
- Old media
- Open-source journalism
- Participatory media
- Social news
- Wiki journalism
- Wikinews
