= Trust Café =

Micro-blogging Internet service

- Former logo from before rebrand
- Website type: News, social networking service
- Available in: Multilingual
- Founded: October 2019; 6 years ago
- Headquarters: London, United Kingdom
- Area served: Worldwide
- Founders: Jimmy Wales; Orit Kopel
- Industry: Social networking service
- Website: www.trustcafe.io
- Commercial: Yes (funded by members)
- Registration: Required (gratis)
- Users: 450,000 users
- Launched: October 2019; 6 years ago
- Current status: Active
- Content license: Proprietary license

Trust Café, formerly known as WT.Social, WT, and WikiTribune Social, is a microblogging and social networking service on which users contribute to "subwikis". It was founded in October 2019 by Wikipedia cofounder Jimmy Wales as an alternative to Facebook and Twitter. The service contains no advertisements and runs on donations. On launch it gained 400,000 registered users by December 3, 2019. Member growth slowed down thereafter; the site had 508,980 users on November 5, 2022. In 2023 a beta for a successor version was launched, branded "Trust Café".

== Creation and launch ==
Jimmy Wales created WT.Social (originally formatted as "WT:Social") after becoming frustrated with Facebook and Twitter for what he called their "clickbait nonsense". The format is meant to combat fake news by providing evidence-based news with links and clear sources. Users are able to edit and flag misleading links. WT.Social allows users to share links to news-sites with other users in "subwikis". Unlike its predecessor (WikiTribune, which Wales co-founded with Orit Kopel), WT.Social was not crowdfunded. CBS San Francisco quoted Wales as wanting to "keep a tight rein on the costs". In October 2019, Wales launched the site. When a new user signed up they would be placed on a waiting list with thousands of others. To skip the list and gain access to the site, users either had to make a donation or share a link with friends. By November 6, the site had 25,000 users. That number was claimed to be 200,000 by mid-November and 400,000 by December 3. However, this rapid growth was not sustained; the number of users reported as of November 5, 2022 was 508,980.

== Subsequent development ==
Quoted in the Stanford Social Innovation Review for Summer 2020, Wales said: "We're not doing a good job of actually exposing the best stuff on the platform. So that's kind of our next phase in evolution." This approach involved highlighting contributions by public figures.

In 2023, WT.Social launched WTS2 beta, a remake of WT.Social, which Wales said would become the defacto software for WT.Social. It is currently in beta and Wales attributed the lack of posts and activity on WT.Social's main platform due to users migrating to the new software. By July 2023 WTS2 beta had been branded "Trust Café", and was seen by a Tages Anzeiger journalist as of interest to people leaving Twitter, although more like Reddit in function, and as being set up as a community. During a short broadcast interview in September 2023, Wales referred to Trust Café as a "small pilot project" in which "the idea is to replace social networks that really feed on attention, and likes and shares and all that and instead, the votes of trustworthiness based by trustworthy members of our community".

As of 2025, users can increase their trust levels, and as a result the visibility of their posts among other features, by getting votes from the community as well as paying for an $8/month most users would need to advance beyond the Bronze tier.

== Software ==
As of launch, WT.Social runs on proprietary software. However, as of November 7, 2019, Wales stated that he had just learnt about ActivityPub and was looking into it. In November 2019, Wales posted on Twitter that the code would be released under GPLv3 in the future.
