= Democratic journalism =

Democratic journalism is a term describing a phenomenon where news stories are ranked by a vote among the stories' readers. This phenomenon has been brought about largely due to the creation of social networking sites such as Digg and Newsvine.

The effect of democratic journalism is that it promotes news based on the popular opinion of the majority, or the "wisdom of the crowd". This differs from more traditional approaches, such as the one commonly used in the newspaper industry, where an editor would decide whether to print a particular news story.

Some authors look at democratic journalism as taking in rights to free speech, assembly, human rights, the rule of law and other mechanisms to check abuses. It also takes in civic consciousness and social solidarity. Journalism then has a clear link with democracy, and is shaped accordingly. This would also have different meanings in First, Second and Third World nations. The democratic role of journalism should transcend excessive commercialism, sensationalism, and manipulation by media elites.

== Problems ==
A common problem faced by democratic journalism is the unreliability and bias of the voting system used, which may not reflect the actual opinions of the majority. Many of the mediums which help enable democratic journalism suffer from problems such as gaming, bias, censorship, and lack of professional review. However, other approaches will also suffer from many of these problems. In order to get a set of news stories, at some point, something must decide one story's rank over another using some criteria. A different approach at making such a selection simply changes the source of the bias.

== See also ==
- Journalism
- Citizen journalism
