= Peter Bale =

New Zealand journalist and editor

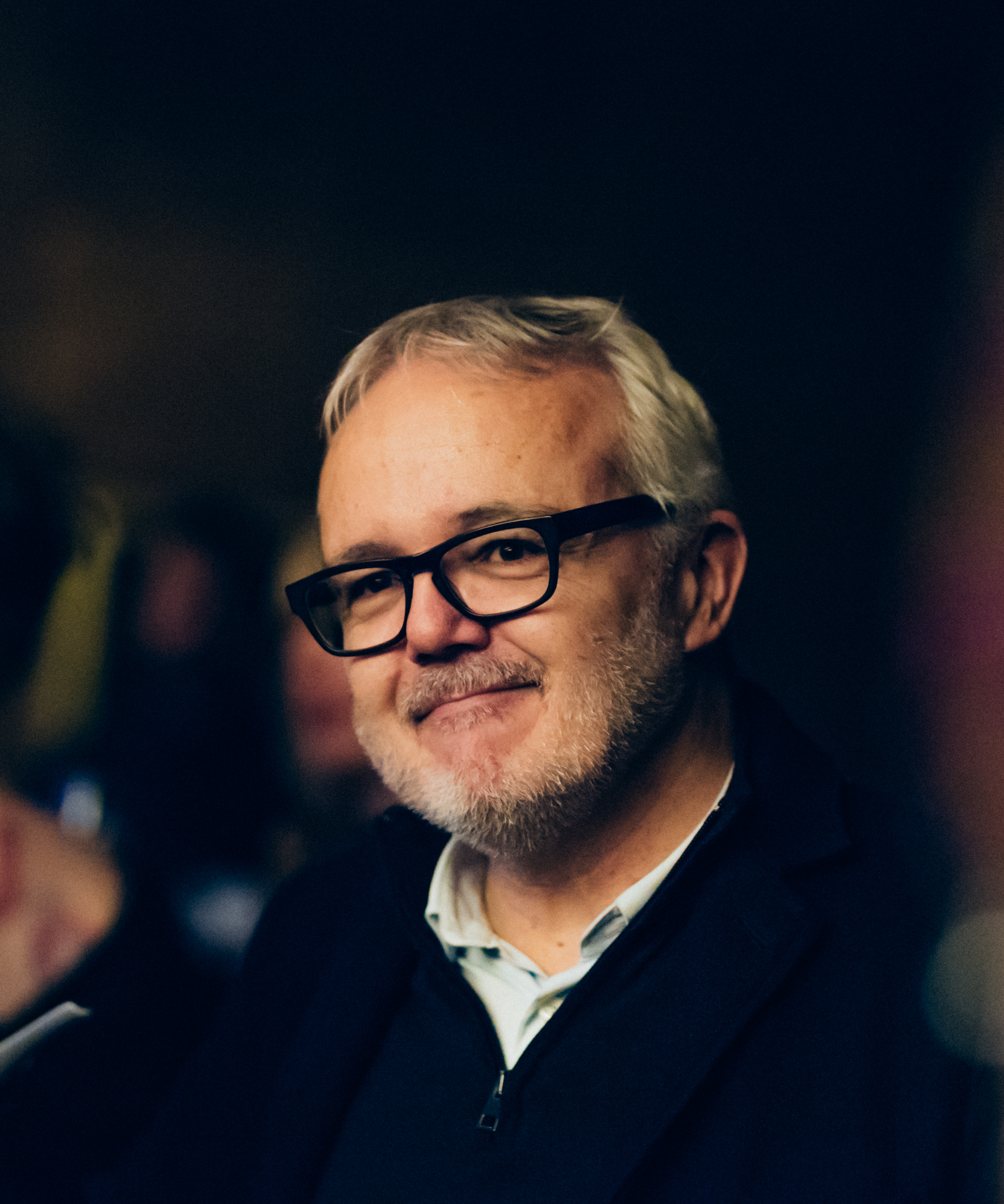
Bale at the Freedom of Expression Awards in April 2019

Peter Bale (born 15 September 1962) is a New Zealand-born journalist and editor. In August 2017 he was named the launch editor of WikiTribune, a position he held only briefly. Bale previously served as director of the Center for Public Integrity from 2014–2016 after a long career in journalism.

== Early life and career ==
Bale was born in Christchurch, New Zealand, and grew up in One Tree Hill. He graduated from Penrose High School and started in journalism at the Auckland Western Leader. In 1981 he joined the Wairarapa Times-Age, followed by three years at the Wellington Evening Post covering politics.

In 1985, he took a position with Reuters in Sydney, and later moved to Europe, Asia, and the Middle East. After 15 years at Reuters, he then went into online journalism as a founder of FTMarketWatch.com and an online editorial director for News Corporation's Times Online. He later became an executive producer for MSN UK.

== 2011 to present ==
In 2011, Bale joined CNN as the Vice-President of CNN International Digital. In December 2014, he was named CEO of the Center for Public Integrity, replacing William Buzenberg. The Panama Papers leak to the Center occurred during his time as CEO. In November 2016, Bale left the Center to "pursue other international media opportunities" and John Dunbar was named as his successor.

In August 2017, Bale was announced as the launch editor of WikiTribune. He no longer was with WikiTribune by 24 April 2018.
