= Fron =

Fron may refer to:

== Places ==
=== Norway ===
- Fron Municipality, a former municipality in Innlandet county
- Nord-Fron Municipality, a municipality in Innlandet county
- Sør-Fron Municipality, a municipality in Innlandet county

=== Wales ===
- Fron, a colloquial name for the village of Froncysyllte in Wrexham county borough
- Fron, Powys, a small village in Llanbadarn Fawr in Powys county
- Y Fron, a country village on the south-west side of Moel Tryfan in North Wales

=== Iceland ===
- Frón is a synonym for the name Iceland in Icelandic (Ísland).

== See also ==
- Frons (disambiguation)
