= The Terror Timeline =

2004 non-fiction book

The Terror Timeline: Year by Year, Day by Day, Minute by Minute: A Comprehensive Chronicle of the Road to 9/11 — and America's Response
- Author: Paul Thompson
- Subject: September 11 attacks
- Publisher: ReganBooks
- Publication date: September 7, 2004
- Publication place: United States
- Pages: 608
- ISBN: 0-06-078338-9
- OCLC: 56568292

The Terror Timeline: Year by Year, Day by Day, Minute by Minute: A Comprehensive Chronicle of the Road to 9/11 — and America's Response is a compilation of over 5,000 reports and articles concerning the September 11, 2001 attacks.

The book was compiled by a Stanford University alumnus and 9/11 researcher Paul Thompson, and by other contributors to the History Commons website (formerly operated by the Center for Cooperative Research).

== Influence ==
The book and its online counterpart were used by the Jersey Girls in their attempts to influence the work of the 9/11 Commission. Kristen Breitweiser has personally endorsed the book, stating, "If you want to know everything about 9/11, you must read this book ... Our intelligence agencies should be recruiting people like Paul Thompson, because he's brilliant". The 9/11 Truth Movement film 9/11: Press for Truth documents the journey of the Jersey Girls and it uses the book and website as its primary reference.

Thompson's work was cited as a key piece of research in a Complaint and Petition, which seeks a criminal inquiry and/or grand jury investigation into "the many still unsolved crimes of September 11, 2001," that was filed with and accepted by the New York Attorney General's Office.

His work is also cited in the books Bad News by Tom Fenton and Fog Facts by Larry Beinhart. Richard Clarke has put it on his reading list for his course on "Terrorism, Security, and Intelligence" at Harvard University.

== Contents ==
1. "Before 9/11" - the background of Osama bin Laden and the beginnings of al-Qaeda; early assessments by intelligences agencies concerning the possibility of a large scale attack.
2. "The Terrorists" - profiles the al-Qaeda cell in Hamburg, Germany, the mastermind of 9/11, Khalid Shaikh Mohammed, and the other terrorists who were involved with the plot.
3. "Geopolitics and 9/11" - Pakistan, Saudi Arabia, Israel, and Iraq: their relationships with and assessments of al-Qaeda.
4. "The Attacks" - a minute-by-minute account of the day, September 11, 2001.
5. "The post 9/11 World" - America's response in the war on terror and the investigations into the attacks on 9/11.

The Terror Timeline had contained previously published reports that were subsequently retracted, including allegations against a Saudi man, Mohammed Al Amoudi, that he had funded, supported, or is associated with Osama bin Laden, Al Qaeda, and their terrorist activities. The sources cited in the book also incorrectly said that Al Amoudi was a defendant in a lawsuit filed by families of 9/11 victims. These reports were based on published news reports that were later retracted but cited in first edition runs of the book before later being retracted by the news sources who made the allegations. HarperCollins removed these references in reprints after January 2005. Upon discovery of this, Paul Thompson and the Center for Cooperative Research made a public apology and the information was removed from the organization's website as well as from future editions of the book.

== Author - Paul Thompson ==
Paul Thompson is the author of The Terror Timeline, a compilation of over 5,000 reports and articles concerning the September 11, 2001 attacks. The book was based on research conducted by himself and other contributors to the History Commons website. Thompson's research in the field has garnered over 100 radio interviews, along with TV interviews on Fox News and Air America and interviews in print, such as for Buzz Magazine. Articles about himself, his research and its reception by the 9/11 Truth Movement have appeared in The Village Voice and Esquire Magazine's "Genius Issue". and recognition as "an authority on terrorism", even though, "He never studied, trained", as noted by Esquire. In 2005, Thompson was asked to speak at a congressional briefing on the 9/11 Commission’s final report, he addressed what he defined as failures by the Federal Aviation Administration (FAA) and North American Aerospace Defense Command (NORAD).

Paul Thompson was born in Pacific Beach, California and currently holds a psychology degree from Stanford University obtained in 1990. He now spends time there and in New Zealand. He is a freelance researcher and has worked in the past as an environmental activist at an environmental-protection firm.

Mr. Thompson has made numerous appearances on Link TV and Free Speech TV. He helps these independent channels raise money.
