= Crowdfunded journalism =

Type of journalism

Crowdfunded journalism is journalism that is financially sourced by the collection of donations from the general public. Typically, journalists rely on micropayments from ordinary people to finance their reporting. Crowdfunding is typically related to crowdsourcing, because the source of funding is often from a larger third-party group or crowd. The audience can support journalism projects by donating sums of money, or other resources, through popular crowdfunding websites such as GoFundMe and Kickstarter. In the early 2010s, there were a variety of crowdfunding sites that only supported journalistic endeavors, but many are since retired due to conflicts of interest, such as Spot.us.

Typically, crowdfunded journalism has four types of donation systems: "Single individuals, Small groups of unaffiliated individuals, Media outlets or organizations, and Public or private institutions such as universities."

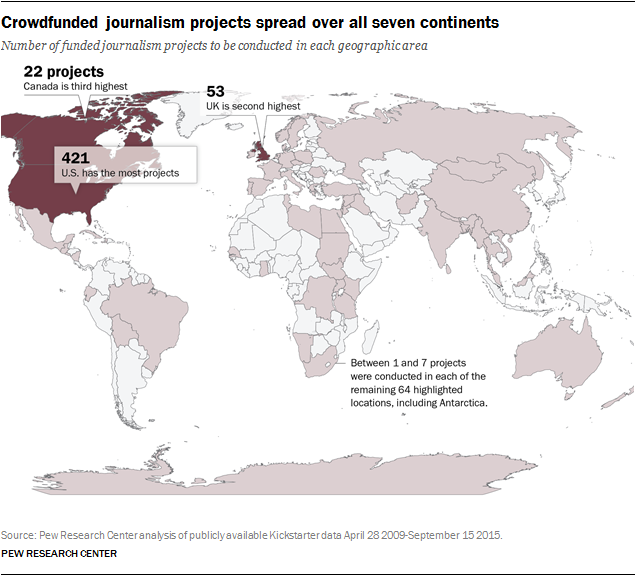
Crowd-funded Journalism extends across all seven continents, with 34% of all projects "foreign-based."

== Characteristics ==
In the rapidly changing field of media, the financial pressures upon newspapers have led to the downsizing of newsroom staff nationwide, with local newsrooms especially hard hit. Journalists have faced challenges because of media concentration, ownership, and a technological shift towards news content from the Internet. That decrease has fueled the rise of crowdfunded journalism as a way for journalists to financially stabilize their careers outside of corporate media. Crowdfunded journalism also gives journalists opportunities to create content outside of the mainstream media scope. Crowdfunded journalism fundamentally reshapes what it means to be a news reader: Users can directly fund the stories they care about, and writers have a level of independence and freedom to choose specific topics or coverage of events, rather than being directed by a common company-affiliated newsroom.

=== Public engagement ===
Crowdfunding has been in existence since before the rise of the Web. The idea is that: "Through small donations from the crowd, large projects that no ordinary individual could fund on his or her own can be started."

The increase of crowdfunded journalism has altered the way audiences participate and interact with media. Audiences have a more direct, personal connection to their writers and producers, while content producers can receive direct feedback on what is desired. There is also an increase in opportunities for "special projects" and "citizen journalism." Both amateur and professional journalists, with ideas and passions for their specific communities, share a collective of information that actively work as "sourcing."

Crowdfunded journalism gives equal opportunity for the general public to participate with their journalistic interests. There are no specific requirements that journalists need to use crowdfunding, nor are there requirements for citizen journalists to utilize crowdfunding to fund blogs, websites, etc.

=== Issues and controversies ===
Crowdfunded journalism gives more power to independent companies to make individual decisions based on their audience. This has raised concerns in the past from mainstream journalism outlets over an increased presence of content contradicting the mainstream media message, most notably the rise of misinformation on the internet. Since the start of the pandemic, numerous crowdfunded media outlets began pushing misinformation and disinformation across various social media platforms. Mainstream media has been battling to curb this trend, but the growth of crowdfunded journalism has made the process increasingly difficult.

Another issue surrounding crowdfunded journalism involves single-source articles. This process occurs when a writer makes or backs up arguments without using any other sources, disregarding all other facts, which can lead to the spread of misinformation.

There can also be challenges when trying to meet objectivity expectations and avoid "conflicts of interest". The closure of Spot.us, a platform that was used solely to crowdfund journalism, partially occurred because of these conflicts of interest. Readers of the journalism were also the ones supporting the work, and many writers felt pressured to cater to the needs of their paying audience. For many writers, this impeded their journalistic independence.

The motivations of crowdfunded journalists also impeded sustained crowdfunded journalistic endeavors. Both writers and donors often considered the writing to be fun, and preferred "to leave that work to the 'professionals'."

=== Crowdfunded journalism projects ===
Though Kickstarter is a U.S.-based website, it allows residents from 18 countries to propose projects (16 countries in North America and Europe, plus Australia and New Zealand) – and, indeed, 16% of funded projects received their funds in currencies other than U.S. dollars. Nevertheless, 64% of the funded Kickstarter journalism proposals were for projects to be conducted within the borders of the United States, while 34% were to be conducted in foreign countries. Only a small percentage of proposals (2%) were for projects that explicitly were to be carried out in both the U.S. and one or more other countries.

The foreign-based projects touched all seven continents – at least 64 countries in all, from Tonga to Iraq and from Cuba to South Africa as well as the Palestinian territories. Beyond the U.S., the UK had the greatest number of projects at 53, followed by Canada at 22. Other countries had somewhere between one and seven projects.

Another way to think about these funded projects is according to the format or structure of the journalism being produced. Researchers found 14 media formats represented in the journalism projects. The most common ones tend to be larger and longer enterprises "that would not be possible without the support of independent donors." Among this array of formats, magazine-related projects – including the launch of new full-fledged publications, the expansion of issue-based coverage by a news magazine, and standalone articles that the producers planned to pitch to existing magazines or journals – topped the list as the single most popular format, making up 20% of all funded projects in the Journalism category.

== Examples of crowdfunded journalism ==
- Block Club Chicago
- De Correspondent
- Hong Kong Free Press
- Krautreporter
- National Observer
- ProPublica
- Tortoise Media
- El Español
- Republik
- Bellingcat
- The Bristol Cable
