= Interactive journalism =

Type of journalism that allows consumers to contribute

Interactive journalism is a new type of journalism that allows consumers to directly contribute to the story. Through Web 2.0 technology, reporters can develop a conversation with the audience. The digital age has changed how people collect information. News from print newspapers, once the only source for news, have seen declines in circulation as people get news on the Internet.

== Background ==
As more people have moved from consuming news through traditional outlets—such as newspapers and broadcast news—, the barely surviving traditional news entities have aimed at transforming their reporting process to respond to the desires and needs of the 21st Century news consumers. This inevitable change of reporting techniques is based on a universal question: mainly, "If journalism is distributed in a community but no one pays attention to it, is it journalism? Can journalism exist without an audience?"

In an attempt to continue exercising their role as communicators, many traditional media outlets have adopted different convergence strategies. News outlets have submerged into technology convergence. This is exemplified by how newspapers have leaned towards not only producing print content, but are also utilizing video, graphics, sound clips and social media in their reporting process. Interactive journalism allows media outlets to "include convergence with citizens, the public, as well."

Interactive journalism has developed as an effort to redefine and reengage the audience. It has the potential to redefine news, allowing the consumer to determine what has news value, becoming the producer and/or editor of the news. As the role of the consumer is being redefined by the easy access allowed by the Internet, journalists are also in the process of redefining their roles. Interactive journalism redefines the role that the media industry for centuries has undertaken. As Janice Hume explains, "The history of America is written in the stories of its communities, and media have told communities' stories almost from the start."

However, in the 21st Century, the challenge for media outlets is that communities do not longer solely depend on news entities to tell their stories. Instead, community members have a wide range of online elements, such as blogs, websites and social media, to disseminate their stories. Therefore, media outlets have been forced to widen the definition "of mass media from 'one-to-many' to 'many-to-many' communication." Interactive journalism is similar, but not identical, to collaborative journalism, in which rather than converse with the reporter, individual reporters without affiliation to the parent organization contribute and provide news items and reports. Joyce Y.M. Nip identifies five models of public journalism. (1) Traditional journalism, (2) public journalism, (3) interactive journalism, (4) participatory journalism and (5) citizen journalism. These five models vary on the degree of public participation in the reporting process, with traditional journalism involving the least degree of participation and citizen journalism involving the most.

One of the most popular interactive journalism tools are blogs, which allow grassroot news to be developed by eyewitnesses or those with expertise or interest in a particular subject area. Bloggers often cite and link to mainstream news articles and mainstream journalists often get story ideas from blogs they monitor. The blog format allows readers to add further information or corrections. Many blogs syndicate their content to subscribers using RSS, a popular content distribution tool. Besides conversations, videos, audio slide shows and games are employed to convey information. A new emerging trend is the use of mobile apps. Where such apps like Countable or Openreporter Bulletin allow individuals to work in real time with reporters and or other civic activists. Interactive journalism is often associated with civic journalism for its ability to explore new and creative ways to amplify community conversation with the idea of solving public problems.

Interactive journalism is being pioneered and supported by Jan Schaffer and J-Lab: The Institute for Interactive Journalism, of which Schaffer is the executive director, at the University of Maryland. J-Lab is the successor to the work Schaffer led at the Pew Center for Civic Journalism. J-Lab's Knight-Batten Awards for Innovations in Journalism honor spotlight news and information that is more than multimedia journalism and rewards novel efforts to involve citizens actively in public issues, to invite their participation and create entry points that stir their imagination and engagement. 2007 Grand Prize was awarded to techPresident.com Another approach to interactive journalism is in development at the Donald W. Reynolds School of Journalism, at the University of Nevada, Reno, in the Interactive Environmental Journalism Masters Program.

In 2021, interactive journalism was used by media outlets covering the killing of Gabby Petito. WFLA-TV in Tampa, Florida streamed coverage of Petito's disappearance and the subsequent homicide investigation on WFLA Now, a social media streaming platform that featured real-time interaction with viewers.

== See also ==
- Web Documentary
- Collaborative journalism
