= Digital journalism =

Editorial content published via the Internet

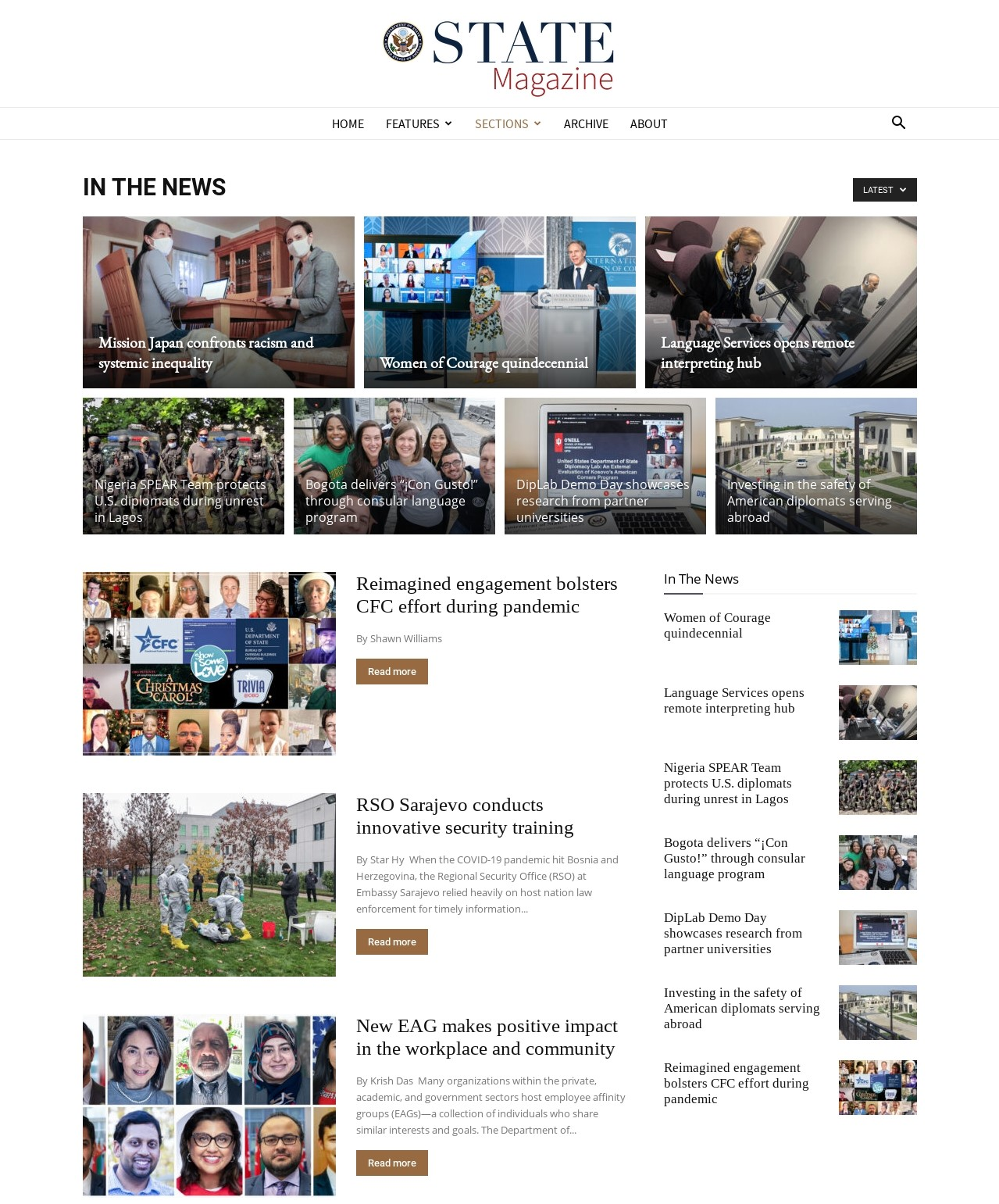
A screenshot of State Magazine news section

Digital journalism, also known as netizen journalism or online journalism, is a contemporary form of journalism where editorial content is distributed via the Internet, as opposed to publishing via print or broadcast. What constitutes digital journalism is debated amongst scholars. However, the primary product of journalism, which is news and features on current affairs, is presented solely or in combination as text, audio, video, or some interactive forms like storytelling stories or newsgames and disseminated through digital media technology.

Fewer barriers to entry, lowered distribution costs and diverse computer networking technologies have led to the widespread practice of digital journalism. It has democratized the flow of information that was previously controlled by traditional media including newspapers, magazines, radio, and television. Most readers expect online journalists to be reliable and competent, but these journalists often fail to meet this standard because they have very short deadlines and do not have enough resources to produce decent work.

Some have asserted that a greater degree of creativity can be exercised with digital journalism when compared to traditional journalism and traditional media. The digital aspect may be central to the journalistic message and remains, to some extent, within the creative control of the writer, editor and/or publisher.

It has been acknowledged that reports of its growth have tended to be exaggerated. In fact, a 2019 Pew survey showed a 16% decline in the time spent on online news sites since 2016. In the United States, reports issued by the Federal Communications Commission (FCC) in 2011 and by the Government Accountability Office (GAO) and the Congressional Research Service (CRS) in 2023 found that increases in newsroom staffing at digital-native news websites from 2008 to 2020 were not offsetting cuts in newsroom staffing among newspapers (which numbered in the tens of thousands of jobs), and that newspapers and television (which had been seeing declining newsroom staffing alongside newspapers) still employed the majority of payrolled newsroom staff in the United States in 2022 while online-only news websites employed less than 10%.

The GAO and CRS reports noted further that the reduction in subscription and advertising revenue for the U.S. newspaper industry from 2000 to 2020 that constituted the overwhelming majority of its inflation-adjusted total revenue was not being offset by digital circulation or online advertising despite almost two-thirds of U.S. advertising spending in total by 2020 being online. Also, while the FCC report noted that local television stations in the United States had become some of the largest providers of local news online, the FCC found in a 2021 working paper that inflation-adjusted advertising revenue for television stations fell nationally from 2010 to 2018.

== Overview ==
Digital journalism flows as journalism flows and is difficult to pinpoint where it is and where it is going. In partnership with digital media, digital journalism uses facets of digital media to perform journalist tasks, for example, using the internet as a tool rather than a singular form of digital media. There is no absolute agreement as to what constitutes digital journalism. Mu Lin argues that, "Web and mobile platforms demand us to adopt a platform-free mindset for an all-inclusive production approach – create the [digital] contents first, then distribute via appropriate platforms." The repurposing of print content for an online audience is sufficient for some, while others require content created with the digital medium's unique features like hypertextuality. Fondevila Gascón adds multimedia and interactivity to complete the digital journalism essence. For Deuze, online journalism can be functionally differentiated from other kinds of journalism by its technological component which journalists have to consider when creating or displaying content.

Digital journalistic work may range from purely editorial content like CNN (produced by professional journalists) online to public-connectivity websites like Slashdot (communication lacking formal barriers of entry). The difference of digital journalism from traditional journalism may be in its re-conceptualised role of the reporter in relation to audiences and news . The expectations of society for instant information was important for the evolution of digital journalism. However, it is likely that the exact nature and roles of digital journalism will not be fully known for some time. Some researchers even argue that the free distribution of online content, online advertisement and the new way recipients use news could undermine the traditional business model of mass media distributors that is based on single-copy sales, subscriptions and the selling of advertisement space.

== History ==
The first type of digital journalism, called teletext, was invented in the UK in 1970. Teletext is a system allowing viewers to choose which stories they wish to read and see it immediately. The information provided through teletext is brief and instant, similar to the information seen in digital journalism today. The information was broadcast between the frames of a television signal in what was called the vertical blanking interval or VBI.

American journalist Hunter S. Thompson relied on early digital communication technology beginning by using a fax machine to report from the 1971 US presidential campaign trail as documented in his book Fear and Loathing on the Campaign Trail.

After the invention of teletext was the invention of videotex, of which Prestel was the world's first system, launching commercially in 1979 with various British newspapers, such as the Financial Times lining up to deliver newspaper stories online through it. Videotex closed down in 1986 due to failing to meet end-user demand.

American newspaper companies took notice of the new technology and created their own videotex systems, the largest and most ambitious being Viewtron, a service of Knight-Ridder launched in 1981. Others were Keycom in Chicago and Gateway in Los Angeles. All of them had closed by 1986.

Next came computer Bulletin Board Systems. In the late 1980s and early 1990s, several smaller newspapers started online news services using BBS software and telephone modems. The first of these was the Albuquerque Tribune in 1989.

Computer Gaming World in September 1992 broke the news of Electronic Arts' acquisition of Origin Systems on Prodigy, before its next issue went to press. Online news websites began to proliferate in the 1990s. An early adopter was The News & Observer in Raleigh, North Carolina which offered online news as Nando. Steve Yelvington wrote on the Poynter Institute website about Nando, owned by The N&O, by saying "Nando evolved into the first serious, professional news site on the World Wide Web". It originated in the early 1990s as "NandO Land". It is believed that a major increase in digital online journalism occurred around this time when the first commercial web browsers, Netscape Navigator (1994) and Internet Explorer (1995). By 1996, most news outlets had an online presence. Although journalistic content was repurposed from original text/video/audio sources without change in substance, it could be consumed in different ways because of its online form through toolbars, topically grouped content, and intertextual links. A twenty-four-hour news cycle and new ways of user-journalist interaction web boards were among the features unique to the digital format. Later, portals such as AOL and Yahoo! and their news aggregators (sites that collect and categorize links from news sources) led to news agencies such as The Associated Press to supplying digitally suited content for aggregation beyond the limit of what client news providers could use in the past.

Salon, another news aggregator, was founded in 1995. In 2001, the American Journalism Review called Salon the Internet's "preeminent independent venue for journalism."

In 2008, for the first time, more Americans reported getting their national and international news from the internet, rather than newspapers. Young people aged 18 to 29 now primarily get their news via the Internet, according to a Pew Research Center report. Audiences to news sites continued to grow due to the launch of new news sites, continued investment in news online by conventional news organisations, and the continued growth in internet audiences overall. Sixty-five percent of youth now primarily access the news online.

Mainstream news sites are the most widespread form of online news media production. As of 2000, the vast majority of journalists in the Western world now use the internet regularly in their daily work. In addition to mainstream news sites, digital journalism is found in index and category sites (sites without much original content but multiple links to existing news sites), meta- and comment sites (sites about news media issues like media watchdogs) and share and discussion sites (sites that facilitate the connection of people, like Slashdot). Blogs are also another digital journalism phenomenon capable of fresh information, ranging from personal sites to those with audiences of hundreds of thousands. Digital journalism is involved in the cloud journalism phenomenon, a constant flow of contents in the Broadband Society.

Prior to 2008, the industry had hoped that publishing news online would prove lucrative enough to fund the costs of conventional news-gathering. In 2008, however, online advertising began to slow down, and little progress was made towards development of new business models. The Pew Project for Excellence in Journalism describes its 2008 report on the State of the News Media, its sixth, as its bleakest ever. Despite the uncertainty, online journalists report expanding newsrooms. They believe advertising is likely to be the best revenue model supporting the production of online news.

Multiple news organisations based in other media also distribute news online, but the amount they use of the new medium varies. Some news organisations use the Web exclusively or as a secondary outlet for their content. The Online News Association, founded in 1999, is the largest organisation representing online journalists, with more than 1,700 members whose principal livelihood involves gathering or producing news for digital presentation.

The Internet challenges traditional news organisations in several ways. Newspapers may lose classified advertising to websites, which are often targeted by interest instead of geography. These organisations are concerned about real and perceived loss of viewers and circulation to the Internet.

Hyperlocal journalism is journalism within a small community. Hyperlocal journalism, like other types of digital journalism, is convenient for the reader and offers more information than former types of journalism. It is free or inexpensive.

=== Reports of Facebook interfering in journalism ===
It has been acknowledged that Facebook has invested heavily in news sources and purchasing time on local news media outlets. Tech Crunch journalist Josh Constine even stated in February 2018 that the company "stole the news business" and used sponsorship to make multiple news publishers its "ghostwriters." In January 2019, founder Mark Zuckerberg announced that he will spend $300 million in local news buys over a three-year period.

== Impact on readers ==
Digital journalism allows for connection and discussion at levels that print does not offer on its own. People can comment on articles and start discussion boards to discuss articles. Before the Internet, spontaneous discussion between readers who had never met was impossible. The process of discussing a news item is a big portion of what makes for digital journalism. People add to the story and connect with other people who want to discuss the topic.

Digital journalism creates an opportunity for niche audiences, allowing people to have more options as to what to view and read.

Digital journalism opens up new ways of storytelling; through the technical components of the new medium, digital journalists can provide a variety of media, such as audio, video and digital photography. Regarding to how this affects the users and how it changes their usage of news, research finds that, other than a different layout and presentation in which the news are perceived, there is no drastic difference in remembering and processing the news.

Digital journalism represents a revolution of how news is consumed by society. Online sources are able to provide quick, efficient, and accurate reporting of breaking news in a matter of seconds, providing society with a synopsis of events as they occur. Throughout the development of the event, journalists are able to feed online sources the information keeping readers up-to-date in mere seconds. The speed in which a story can be posted can affect the accuracy of the reporting in a way that doesn't usually happen in print journalism. Before the emergence of digital journalism the printing process took much more time, allowing for the discovery and correction of errors.

News consumers must become Web literate and use critical thinking to evaluate the credibility of sources. Because it is possible for anyone to write articles and post them on the Internet, the definition of journalism is changing. Because it is becoming increasingly simple for the average person to have an impact in the news world through tools like blogs and even comments on news stories on reputable news websites, it becomes increasingly difficult to sift through the massive amount of information coming in from the digital area of journalism.

There are great advantages with digital journalism and the new blogging evolution that people are becoming accustomed to, but there are disadvantages. For instance, people are used to what they already know and can't always catch up quickly with the new technologies in the 21st century. The goals of print and digital journalism are the same, although different tools are needed to function.

The interaction between the writer and consumer is new, and this can be credited to digital journalism. There are a number of ways to get personal thoughts on the Web. There are some disadvantages to this, however, the main one being factual information. There is a pressing need for accuracy in digital journalism, and until they find a way to press accuracy, they will still face some criticism.

One major dispute regards the credibility of these online news websites. A digital journalism credibility study performed by the Online News Association compares the online public credibility ratings to actual media respondent credibility ratings. Looking at a variety of online media sources, the study found that overall the public saw online media as more credible than it actually is.

The effects of digital journalism are evident worldwide. This form of journalism has pushed journalists to reform and evolve. Older journalists who are not tech savvy have felt the blunt force of this. In recent months, a number of older journalists have been pushed out and younger journalists brought in because of their lower cost and ability to work in advanced technology settings.

== Impact on publishers ==
Multiple newspapers, such as The New York Times, have created online sites to retain and bring in new clients,also haven taken advantage of audio, video and text linking to remain at least top ten news consumers' lists as most of the news enthusiasm now reach their base through hand held devices such as smartphones, tablets etc. Hence audio or video backing is a definite advantage.

Newspapers rarely break news stories any more, with most websites reporting on breaking news before the cable news channels. Digital journalism allows for reports to start out vague and generalized, and progress to a better story. Newspapers and TV cable are at a disadvantage because they generally can only put together stories when an ample amount of detail and information are available. Often, newspapers have to wait for the next day, or even two days later if it is a late-breaking story, before being able to publish it. Newspapers lose a lot of ground to their online counterparts, with advertising revenue shifting to the Internet, and subscription to the printed paper decreasing. People are now able to find the news they want, when they want, without having to leave their homes or pay to receive the news, even though there are still people who are willing to pay for online journalistic content.

Because of this, some people have viewed digital journalism as the death of journalism. According to communication scholar Nicole Cohen, "four practices stand out as putting pressure on traditional journalism production: outsourcing, unpaid labour, metrics and measurement, and automation". Free advertising on websites such as Craigslist has transformed how people publicize; the Internet has created a faster, cheaper way for people to get news out, thus creating the shift in ad sales from standard newspapers to the Internet. There has been a substantial effect of digital journalism and media on the newspaper industry, with the creation of new business models. It is now possible to contemplate a time in the near future when major towns will no longer have a newspaper and when magazines and network news operations will employ no more than a handful of reporters. Multiple newspapers and individual print journalists have been forced out of business because of the popularity of digital journalism. The newspapers that have not been willing to be forced out of business have attempted to survive by saving money, laying off staff, shrinking the size of the publications, eliminating editions, as well as partnering with other businesses to share coverage and content. In 2009, one study concluded that most journalists are ready to compete in a digital world and that these journalists believe the transition from print to digital journalism in their newsroom is moving too slowly. Some highly specialized positions in the publishing industry have become obsolete. The growth in digital journalism and the 2008 financial crisis also led to layoffs for those in the industry.

Students wishing to become journalists now need to be familiar with digital journalism in order to be able to contribute and develop journalism skills. Not only must a journalist analyze their audience and focus on effective communication with them, they have to be quick; news websites are able to update their stories within minutes of the news event. Other skills may include creating a website and uploading information using basic programming skills.

Critics believe digital journalism has made it easier for individuals who are not qualified journalists to misinform the general public. Some believe that this form of journalism has created a number of sites that do not have credible information. Sites such as PerezHilton.com have been criticized for blurring the lines between journalism and opinionated writing.

Some critics believe that newspapers should not switch to a solely Internet-based format, but instead keep a component of print as well as digital.

Digital journalism allows citizens and readers the opportunity to join in on threaded discussions relating to a news article that has been read by the public. This can allow writers and reporters to decide what is important to them, their beat, and what should be omitted in the future. These threads can provide useful information to writers of digital journalism so that future articles can be pruned and improved to possibly create a better article the next time around.

== Implications on traditional journalism ==
Digitization is currently causing multiple changes to traditional journalistic practices. The labor of journalists, in general, is becoming increasingly dependent on digital journalism. Scholars outline that this is a change to the execution of journalism and not the conception part of the labor process. They also contend that this is simply the deskilling of some skills and the up-skilling of others. This theory is in contention to the notion that technological determinism is negatively affecting journalism, as it should be understood that it is just changing the traditional skill set. Communication scholar Nicole Cohen believes there are several trends putting pressure on this traditional skill set. Some of which being outsourcing, algorithms and automation. Although Cohen believes that technology could be used to improve journalism, she feels the current trends in digital journalism are so far affecting the practice in a negative way.

There is also the impact that digital journalism is influencing the uprising of citizen journalism. Because digital journalism takes place online and is contributed mostly by citizens on user-generated content sites, there is competition growing between the two. Citizen journalism allows anyone to post anything, and because of that, journalists are being forced by their employers to publish more news content than before, which often means rushing news stories and failing to verify the source of information. Outlets such as Vice Media have also created a resurgence in Gonzo journalism in the form of digital videos and articles.

With the rise of digital journalism, it has shown to affect more than just the location of where information is gathered. In a Pew Research Group Study, they have found that there has been a steady decline in the traditional journalism industry.

Some outlets have had to redefine how they report and distribute news to stay current to consumers in the new digital time. The study shows that newsroom employment dropped 47% between 2008 and 2018, while ad revenue fell from $37.8 billion to $14.3 billion in that same time frame.

== Work outside traditional press ==
The Internet has allowed people who are not journalists by occupation to practice journalism. Bloggers write on web logs or blogs. Traditional journalists often do not consider bloggers, who are likelier to be amateurs and to not follow professional journalism's standards of accuracy and impartiality, to automatically be journalists. In the United States, the Electronic Frontier Foundation has been instrumental in advocating for the rights of journalist bloggers.

The Supreme Court of Canada ruled that: "A second preliminary question is what the new defence should be called. In arguments before us, the defence was referred to as the responsible journalism test. This has the value of capturing the essence of the defence in succinct style. However, the traditional media are rapidly being complemented by new ways of communicating on matters of public interest, some of them online, which do not involve journalists. These new disseminators of news and information should, absent good reasons for exclusion, be subject to the same laws as established media outlets. I agree with Lord Hoffmann that the new defence is "available to anyone who publishes material of public interest in any medium": Jameel, at para. 54."

Other significant tools of online journalism are Internet forums, discussion boards and chats. Conflicts such as the Israeli–Palestinian conflict and the First and Second Chechen Wars are discussed on some of these websites. Though people may propose solutions to conflicts there, the discussions themselves often turn into arguments.

Internet radio and podcasts are other growing independent media based on the Internet. The Pew Research Center issued a report in June 2023 that analyzed the content of 451 podcasts listed on the daily top 200 most popular charts of Apple Podcasts and Spotify from April through September 2022. The report found that 15% of the podcasts surveyed had a news or current events focus, and that 46% of the news-focused podcasts were affiliated with a traditional news organisation. Additionally, 51% of the news-focused podcasts covered sports and topics other than politics and government, and while the episodes of the news-focused podcasts tended to be longer and released more frequently, 78% of the news-focused podcasts followed a commentary, interview, news summary, or recap format rather than an in-depth reporting format. Also, while only 8% of the 451 podcasts surveyed were available exclusively through one site (since 90% were also available through Google Podcasts, 82% through Stitcher, and virtually all of the 51% with a video component through YouTube), only 31% were operated independently while 69% were affiliated with a larger organisation, and 47% sought financial support from listeners by paid subscriptions, merchandise sales, or donations with 60% of independently operated podcasts doing so in comparison to 41% of organisation-affiliated podcasts.

Multiple publications have created Application Programming Interfaces (APIs) that provide online access to their data and content, in order to encourage researchers to link to them and create derivative applications.

== Blogs ==
With the rise of digital media, there is a move from the traditional journalist to the blogger or amateur journalist. Blogs can be seen as a new genre of journalism because of their "narrative style of news characterized by personalization" that moves away from traditional journalism's approach, changing journalism into a more conversational and decentralized type of news. Blogging has become a large part of the transmitting of news and ideas across cities, states, and countries and bloggers argue that blogs themselves are now breaking stories. Even online news publications have blogs that are written by their affiliated journalists or other respected writers. Blogging allows readers and journalists to be opinionated about the news and talk about it in an open environment. Blogs allow comments where some news outlets do not, due to the need to constantly monitor what is posted. By allowing comments, the reader can interact with a story instead of just absorbing the words on the screen. According to one 2007 study, 15% of those who read blogs read them for news.

However, a number of blogs are highly opinionated and have a bias. Some are not verified to be true. The Federal Trade Commission (FTC) established guidelines mandating that bloggers disclose any free goods or services they receive from third parties in 2009 in response to a question of the integrity of product and service reviews in the online community.

The development of blogging communities has partly resulted because of the lack of local news coverage, the spread of misinformation, and the manipulation of news. Blogging platforms are often used as mediums to spread ideas and connect to others with similar mentalities. Anonymity lives within these platforms that circulates different perspectives. Some have postulated that blogs' usage of public opinions as facts has gained them status and credibility. Memes are often shared on these blogs due to its social phenomenon and its relation to existing subcultures which often attain high engagement. Traditional journalism has helped set the foundation for blogs, which are frequently used to question mainstream media reported by journalist.

== Citizen journalism ==
Digital journalisms lack of a traditional "editor" has given rise to citizen journalism. The early advances that the digital age offered journalism were faster research, easier editing, conveniences and a faster delivery time for articles. The Internet has broadened the effect that the digital age has on journalism. Because of the popularity of the Internet, most people have access and can add their forms of journalism to the information network. This allows anyone who wants to share something they deem important that has happened in their community. Individuals who are not professional journalists who present news through their blogs or websites are often referred to as citizen journalists. One does not need a college degree to be a citizen journalist. Citizen journalists are able to publish information that may not be reported otherwise and the public has a greater opportunity to be informed. Some companies use the information that a citizen journalist relays when they themselves can not access certain situations, for example, in countries where freedom of the press is limited. Anyone can record events happening and send it anywhere they wish, or put it on their website. Non-profit and grassroots digital journalism sites may have far fewer resources than their corporate counterparts, yet due to digital media are able to have websites that are technically comparable. Other media outlets can then pick up their story and run with it as they please, thus allowing information to reach wider audiences.

For citizen journalism to be effective and successful, there needs to be citizen editors. Their role being to solicit other people to provide accurate information and to mediate interactivity among users. An example can be found in the start-up of the South Korean online daily newspaper, OhMyNews, where the founder recruited several hundred volunteer "citizen reporters" to write news articles that were edited and processed by four professional journalists.

== News collections ==
The Internet also offers options such as personalized news feeds and aggregators, which compile news from different websites into one site. One of the most popular news aggregators is Google News. People who can choose which news they consume tend to consume only or mostly those from outlets that share their political views.

As of March 2005, Wikinews rewrites articles from other news organisations. Original reporting remains a challenge on the Internet as the burdens of verification and legal risks (especially from plaintiff-friendly jurisdictions like BC) remain high in the absence of any net-wide approach to defamation.

== Ethics and morals of digital journalism ==
When journalism started and was consolidated to print they followed the ethical practices of informing consumers promptly and regularly, writing articles with credible information, operating for the public and to publish information that is unbiased.

As discussed in previous sections, digital journalism has opened a door to publish stories that are less traditional. This can be through blogs or citizen journalism, but neither require a traditional background or higher-level education to take part in creating journalism, this can affect the different ways that people now approach creating information and their ethical understandings of journalism.

In a study published by José Alberto García‐Avilés, he discussed that the innovation created by digital journalism doesn't have to be a negative thing. It is just something that now needs to be re-navigated so as to not go against the ethic and morals that journalism was founded on.

Some ethical issues that were listed in his study were verification of information, verification of accuracy, low quality, clickbait, a lack of input from users, a difficulty in making corrections and transparency to consumers.

While ethical challenges are now broadened by this form of innovation, this study discusses that innovation is meant to cause tension between change, it is then a journalist's task to address and find solutions for those challenges. This challenge ultimately goes back to finding ways to normalize traditional journalistic values in digital journalism and promoting credible information, unbiased facts and making corrections when mistakes are made.

== Impacts in accessibility ==
Digital journalism created a new age of information accessibility, not only are writers given more of a platform to create content but consumers also gain more access to information. A large contributor to this wave of accessibility comes from new social media platforms.

Social media allows information to be codified, searched and shared by different organisations.

In a study done by the Pacific Asia Journal of the Association for Information Systems, they found that social media usage positively influences the information accessibility of the organisations that are publishing the information.

However, digital journalism accessibility isn't always viewed in a positive light, a critique that is made towards information accessibility is that technology impacts too much of the context the consumers have towards their digested information.

While digital spaces open up accessibility options, consumers and journalists are again faced with the implications that come with the ethics in digital journalism. When information is presented to a consumer online, it may be written with motivation to sway their beliefs and there is also inherent bias in digital search engines that affect the stories that are likely to be populated.

Another issue in relying on digital journalism is that this form of accessibility doesn't always mean that it's equally accessible for everyone. Navigating a digital space comes with its own challenges, challenges that are often easily navigated for younger audiences and more challenging for others.

== Speed in digital journalism ==
Introducing journalism to a digital sphere changed the way that society consumes news and content. The digital space has created a form of connection between people that has completely altered the speed in which information is created, published and shared.

This concept, like previous ones discussed, comes with both pros and cons.

With digital speed, journalists have found a new pride in being the first to break a story, and because of digital spaces it has become much easier to write and publish news. With this, journalists face the challenge of avoiding being the cause of spreading misinformation.

When publishing information quickly it is important to ensure accuracy of sources, vet all data and remain committed to facts and unbiased truths.

On top of creating misinformation with the speed that articles are being written, there is a new opportunity to spread misinformation quickly and to a large audience. In a study done by the Proceedings of the National Academy of Sciences of the United States of America they found that digital misinformation has become so pervasive in online social media that it has been listed by the WEF as one of the main threats to human society.

While different information can be debunked in different intervals, most of the time the spread of misinformation happens much faster than the spread of clarification, this can lead to a longer lasting effect and damage towards consumers.

In a study done by the Massachusetts Institute of Technology, they found that consumers are more skeptical to share information when they are asked to consider the facts that are used in it. They suggest that digital journalists encourage their readers to be an active contributor to the work that is produced. Something as small as asking them to rate the accuracy of a sub-head to help inform algorithms can influence them to be more aware of what they are consuming and help lessen the spread of misinformation.

== Social Media ==
In a study from the University of Oxford, they analyzed the challenges and opportunities for news media and journalism in a digital environment.

The study found that social media has created a space where most people have access to more news and information about multiple issues but many do not necessarily engage with the information.

They identified that this digital environment has created intense competition for attention, putting pressure on traditional news sources to adapt, there's been a growing importance for there to be a limited number of large technology companies to play important roles in distributing news and the development of social media has influenced a large number of people to opt for more casual and passive forms of information.

Many news organisations combat the notion that they produce unethical work by issuing guidelines and expectations as to what their journalists are allowed to publish, this way they can stay on top of the ever changing digital space while also maintaining notable work.

== See also ==
- Online newspaper
- Open source journalism
- Wikinews
- Toons Mag
- User-generated content

== Sources ==
- Bentley, Clyde H. 2011. Citizen journalism: Back to the future? Geopolitics, History, and International Relations 3 (1): p. 103ff.
- Deuze, Mark. 2003. The web and its journalisms: Considering the consequences of different types of newsmedia online. New Media & Society 5 (2): 203–230.
- Fondevila Gascón, Joan Francesc (2009). El papel decisivo de la banda ancha en el Espacio Iberoamericano del Conocimiento. Revista Iberoamericana de Ciencia, Tecnología y Sociedad–CTS, n. 2, pp. 1–15.
- Fondevila Gascón, Joan Francesc (2010). El cloud journalism: un nuevo concepto de producción para el periodismo del siglo XXI. Observatorio (OBS*) Journal, v. 4, n. 1 (2010), pp. 19–35.
- Fondevila Gascón, Joan Francesc; Del Olmo Arriaga, Josep Lluís and Sierra Sánchez, Javier (2011). New communicative markets, new business models in the digital press. Trípodos (Extra 2011-VI International Conference on Communication and Reality-Life without Media, Universitat Ramon Llull), pp. 301–310.
- Kawamoto, Kevin. 2003. Digital Journalism: Emerging Media and the Changing Horizons of Journalism. Lanham, Md.: Rowman & Littlefield
- Online Journalism Review. 2002. The third wave of online journalism. Online Journalism Review
- Rogers, Tony. What is hyperlocal journalism? Sites that focus on areas often ignored by larger news outlets" about.com, accessdate= September 12, 2011
- Scott, Ben. 2005. A contemporary history of digital journalism. Television & New Media 6 (1): 89–126
- Wall, Melissa. 2005. "Blogs of war: Weblogs as news." Journalism 6 (2): 153–172
- Crawford, Nelson Antrim (1924). The Ethics of Journalism. Johnson Reprint.
- García‐Avilés, José Alberto. "An inquiry into the ethics of innovation in digital journalism." News media innovation reconsidered: Ethics and values in a creative reconstruction of journalism (2021): 1–19.
- Tajudeen, Farzana Parveen; Jaafar, Noor Ismawati; Sulaiman, Ainin (2016-12-31). "Role of Social Media on Information Accessibility". Pacific Asia Journal of the Association for Information Systems. 8 (4). doi:10.17705/1pais.08402. ISSN 1943–7544
- Niles, Sarah, and Susan Hanson. "A new era of accessibility." URISA Journal 15.APA1 (2003): 35–41.
- M. Del Vicario, A. Bessi, F. Zollo, F. Petroni, A. Scala, G. Caldarelli, H.E. Stanley, & W. Quattrociocchi, The spreading of misinformation online, Proc. Natl. Acad. Sci. U.S.A. 113 (3) 554–559, https://doi.org/10.1073/pnas.1517441113 (2016).
- Nielsen, R., Cornia, A., & Kalogeropoulos, A. (2016). Challenges and Opportunities for news media and journalism in an increasingly digital, mobile, and social media environment. In Reuters Institute for the Study of Journalism. Reuters Institute for the Study of Journalism.
