= List of news media APIs =

Some online news media have created Application Programming Interfaces (APIs) to enable computer applications to request stories and information about their stories (metadata) from them.

== List of 1st-party news APIs ==
News organization	API home page	APIs	Note
American Broadcasting Company	ABC Resources API	Resources API	Resources API retrieves content produced by ABC businesses, including national and local news, entertainment videos, and more.
Associated Press	AP Content API	AP Content API; AP Breaking News API	AP Content API allows the search and download of AP Images, one of the world's largest collections of historical and contemporary imagery.; AP Breaking News API retrieve a list of available breaking news categories and then requests content for a specific category.; Headlines and images only. Does not provide full text of articles.
BBC	BBC Platform API [ Currently available only to BBC employees ]	Platform API	"Platform API power all the BBC's product areas - iPlayer, News, Sport, Weather, Children's Knowledge and Learning - as well as many external and partner products such as Youview."
Bloomberg News	Bloomberg API	Bloomberg API	Bloomberg API provides unrestricted access to raw data for customers for its financial market information.
CBS Sports	CBS Sports Development Center [No longer available]	Fantasy Live Scoring API; Rules API; Player Search API; Player Profile API; League Roster API; Schedule API; Salary and Wild Cards API; Playoff Settings API; Playoff Bracket API	Fantasy Scoring API retrieves live scoring data for league.; Rules API retrieves rules for a fantasy league.; Player Search API retrieves a list of players.; Player Profile API retrieves a player's profile.; League Roster API retrieves roster for one team or all teams.; Schedule API retrieves schedule and match information.; Salary and Wild Cards API retrieve wildcard values for a set of players.; Playoff Settings API retrieves playoff settings for a league.; Playoff Bracket API retrieves a league's playoff bracket.
Die Zeit	ZEIT ONLINE Content API	Online Content API	Online content API provides access to articles from the ZEIT archive dating back to 1946 and from ZEIT ONLINE. Currently this API is not available as it has been discontinued by Die Zeit.
Dow Jones and Company	Dow Jones Factiva	Enterprise Integration API	" Share content via enterprise integration API and embeddable widgets while honoring copyright holders."
ESPN	ESPN API NOTE: No new authorized access granted, as of Jan. 2015 [No longer available]	Athlete API; Audio API; Draft API; Headlines API; Leaders API; Medals API; Now API; Photos API; Rankings API; Research Notes API; Scores & Schedules API; Standings API; Teams API; Video API	Athlete API retrieves rosters of players for various sports, as well as biographical and statistical data for individual athletes.; Audio API retrieves ESPN on-demand audio content. This includes ESPN podcasts as well as clips from many live shows on ESPN Radio.; Draft API retrieves information about NBA and NFL draft picks.; Headlines API retrieves ESPN's various news stories.; Leaders API retrieves information on leading athletes in specific statistics categories.; Medals API provides medal and event result information from the Summer and Winter Olympic Games.; Now API provides a stream of the latest content published on ESPN.com, including headline news, stories, columns, blogs, videos, podcasts, game recaps, and more.; Photos API allows interaction with ESPN's photo content.; Rankings API provides rankings of teams and players for various sports, as well as recruiting rankings.; Research Notes API retrieves information from ESPN's vast knowledgebase of exclusive sports data.; Scores & Schedules API provides game/match information, including start times, venue, competitors, score, and stats across every major sport.; Standings API retrieves latest standings for a particular sport by division, conference, or overall.; Teams API provides information on roster, stats, and more, for individual teams.; Video API allows interaction with ESPN's video-on-demand content, which includes hundreds of video clips each week.
Financial Times	FT for Developers	Headline API; Datamining API; Education API; Access API	Headline API allows developers to integrate relevant FT content into the applications of their choice.; Datamining API allows developers to retrieve and host FT articles on their own servers to fully integrate the content into their own products.; Education API bring market context to learning resources, so students have a better understanding of the application of theory.; Access API displays full text FT articles co-mingled with content from other publishers.; Requires a subscription to the Financial Times.
MSNBC	Using the msnbc.com APIs	Documents API; Entities API; Topics API	Documents API represents articles, videos, images, slide shows, and other content available on msnbc.com. Documents API returns Documents related to a list of Entities (keywords), another Document, or a geographic location.; Entities API returns Entities associated with Documents and Topics. Entities are statistically-significant keywords associated Documents.; Topics pages are special msnbc.com pages that are created for entities that reach a specific threshold of "importance". The Topic API returns Topics pages related to Entities or Documents.
NPR	NPR Tech Center [No longer available]; NPR One Developer Center [No longer available]	Story API; Station Finder API; Transcript API	Story API provides audio from most NPR programs dating back to 1995.; Station Finder API used to identify local NPR member stations that carry NPR programming based on zip code, city/state, unique ID, call letters, longitude/latitude, and a few other parameters.; Transcript API provides access to full transcripts of stories airing on selected NPR programs.
PBS	Documentation - COVE API	Cove API	Cove API provides access to full PBS episodes, clips, and promotions.
Reuters		Robust Foundation API	Global Newswires Services in 16 Languages. Rich with facts and context that speak to readers everywhere.
The Guardian	Guardian Open Platform	Content API	Content API provides access to all the content the Guardian creates and the collections it has of that content (tags and sections). There are over one and a half million items available published as far back as 1999.
The New York Times	NYTimes APIs	Archive API; Article Search API; Books API; Most Popular API; Times Wire API; Top Stories API	Archive API returns an array of NYT articles for a given month, going back to 1851.; Article Search API looks up articles by keyword.; Books API provides information about book reviews and The New York Times Best Sellers lists.; Most Popular API provides services for getting the most popular articles on NYTimes.com based on emails, shares, or views.; Times Newswire API gets links and metadata for Times' articles as soon as they are published on NYTimes.com.; Top Stories API returns an array of articles currently on the specified section (arts, business, ...).
USA Today	Developer's Network	Articles API; Best-Selling Books API; Book Reviews API; Breaking News API; Census API; Movie Reviews API; Snapshots API; Music Reviews API; Sports Salaries API	Articles API retrieves USA TODAY stories going back to 2004.; Best-Selling Books API retrieves weekly list of the nation's top-selling books as compiled by USA TODAY.; Book Reviews API retrieves USA TODAY book reviews.; Breaking News API retrieves breaking news content.; Census API provides access to United States Census information.; Movie Reviews API retrieves USA TODAY movie review content.; Snapshots API retrieves easy-to-read statistical graphics that present information on various issues and trends in a visually appealing way.; Music Reviews API retrieves USA TODAY music review content.; Sports Salaries API provides information for the MLB, NFL, NBA and NHL, including player, position and team data and salary.
