= Newsvine =

Defunct online newspaper

- Website type: Online newspaper
- Available in: English
- Dissolved: October 1, 2017; 8 years ago
- Owner: NBC News
- Commercial: Yes
- Registration: Optional
- Launched: March 1, 2006; 20 years ago
- Current status: Defunct

Newsvine was a community-powered, collaborative journalism online newspaper which drew content from its users and syndicated content from mainstream sources such as The Associated Press. Users could write articles, "seed" links to external content, and discuss news items in an online forum. These news items were submitted by both users and professional journalists. Newsvine, the company, was not a news bureau and exercised no editorial voice, but provided social news platform for the online community which had grown around it. Members decided with their online actions what news articles stay on the site and what news is removed. Newsvine was named the Top News Site of 2006 and one of the 50 Best Websites of 2007 by Time magazine.

== History ==
Seattle-based Newsvine, Inc. was founded in the spring of 2005 by Mike Davidson, Calvin Tang, Lance Anderson and Mark Budos. Josh Yockey joined the company shortly after it opened its offices, with Tom Laramee and Tyler Adams being hired later. The development team consisted of several veterans from the Walt Disney Internet Group and ESPN. The company moved into its offices near downtown Seattle on August 1, 2005, and launched newsvine.com into a private "alpha" version on December 1, 2005. On January 5, 2006, the site went into private beta version, and then opened to the public on March 1, 2006. On October 7, 2007, Newsvine announced its acquisition by the news website msnbc.com, effective October 5, 2007. Since the acquisition, Newsvine has continued to run as a separate website and brand from msnbc.com, operating out of its original headquarters in Seattle. On July 16, 2012, msnbc.com was rebranded as NBCNews.com. On October 1, 2017, NBCNEWS closed Newsvine and redirected the Newsvine website to the NBCNEWS web page. Other than a notice on Newsvine, very little coverage indicated the shutdown.

== Features ==
=== Seeding ===
Newsvine allowed users to "seed," or post weblinks for others to view. Seeds usually contained a short description of the source article or a direct quotation from the linked article. With the "Newsvine Button," users could select "Seed Newsvine" from their bookmarks and a "seeding" dialog would appear. Seeds allowed for all of the same options as articles, except the ability to insert photographs and/or polls.

=== Articles ===
One of the key features of Newsvine is the ability for users to write their own articles. Commonly known as citizen journalism, this allows users to express their opinions for public discussion or even report on events in a journalistic manner. The most popular articles for top tags appear in the "Featured Writers" section, where article writers can receive extra publicity. While writing articles, users can upload their own photographs or choose from a list of Flickr photos registered under a Creative Commons license for addition to the post. Captions can be written to clarify the meaning of the photographs.

=== Voting ===
Another common feature among social bookmarking websites is the ability to vote for content. Users who enjoy reading an article/seed or agree with its content are encouraged to vote for the content. Articles and seeds with the most votes appear in the "Top Wire," "Top Seeds," or "Top of the Vine" sections of the site. Newsvine also allows for users to vote for user comments that they enjoyed reading. When a comment receives at least five votes, a green star is placed in the upper right-hand corner, signifying that enough users enjoyed or agreed with the comment. Clicking the star will lead viewers to the next highly rated comment. Negative votes are also registered, and a comment that receives too many negative votes will often be collapsed, so that it can only be viewed by deliberately opening it. This limits discussion under that comment, since new comments under it will not be seen automatically.

=== Commenting ===
The ability to comment on seeds and articles allows for extra discussions regarding the content. While debates are welcome, useless, insulting, and self-promoting comments are not. If a comment receives enough reports, that comment will be collapsed and its contents can only be shown by choosing to expand it. The Newsvine comment system also allows for semi-threaded comments, easing the confusion of comment direction. Users can edit but not delete their own comments. Writers are allowed to delete comments about their own content. Unregistered users are also allowed to have their say, but comments by unregistered users are not made public until that user creates a registered account.

=== User Columns ===
Newsvine also has a social networking aspect, as each registered Newsvine user has user columns. These user columns can be used to manage and share their articles, seeds, online friends, recommendations, and other statistical information. Every user has a user column, and each is given their own subdomain to access it (<user>.newsvine.com). User columns are customizable: aspects of the layouts can be moved or hidden, a user photo and biography can be added, a header (such as a welcome message) can be added, friends can be invited to Newsvine or added to the user's friends list, recommendations (such as favorite books, bands, blogs, etc.) can be shown, and comments and feedback from other users can be managed. Also, through user columns, members have the ability to add other users to their watchlist and friend list. Newsvine also has a social media aspect, as users can send other users a chat invitation, to see if the other user wants to chat online.

=== Earnings ===
Until 2013, Newsvine allowed users to receive 90% of the revenue from advertisements posted on their personal Newsvine pages. These earnings were "based on traffic to your articles and seeds," but it is unclear exactly how Newsvine calculates earnings. The remaining 10% goes to whoever referred the user to Newsvine, or it goes to the website for site maintenance if there was no referrer. Newsvine does not publish the amount of revenue that has gone to users.

=== Conversation Tracker ===
Much like the Watchlist, the Conversation Tracker allows users to track other members' activities online on the site. However, the Conversation Tracker is a notifier of new comments. There are three sections to the Conversation Tracker: new comments from a user's Newsvine column, new comments from articles that a user has commented on, and new comments from an article a user's friend has commented on. If a user has added members to the friend list that share a common interest in content, the Conversation Tracker can act as a list of recommended articles.

=== Friends List ===
The Friends List was a feature that existed prior to 2013, which gave users the ability to meet new people and find others with common interests, but there are no requirements in doing so. Creating a populated friends list gives users the ability to find interesting new articles through the Conversation Tracker. Once a user adds a friend to the list, the added friend receives a notification and is given the ability to accept or decline the offer.

=== Vineacity ===
"Vineacity" was a measure of six elements that contribute to a Newsvine user's overall rating as a positive influence to the Newsvine community. It was retired in 2013. It was earned as 'branches' on a Newsvine logo icon displayed next to the user's name. The six areas of excellence include:

- Courtesy - earned when a user's positive feedback outweighs any abuse reports they may have received.
- Longevity - earned when the users has been active for at least two months after registering.
- Fruitfulness - earned when the user has submitted a substantial amount of content or comments that have received votes.
- Connectedness - earned when the user appears on a substantial number of watchlists and/or friendlists.
- Random Act of Vineness - earned for an exceptional moment of greatness on Newsvine.
- Lifetime achievement - earned when a user has received a combined number of votes on all articles, links and comments around Newsvine.
