= Marc Frons =

American technology executive

- Born: Brooklyn, New York, U.S.
- Citizenship: American
- Education: Brooklyn College (B.A.)
- Occupation: Technology executive

Marc Frons is an American technology executive and former journalist. He served as chief technology officer of News Corp from 2016 to 2019 and as chief information officer of The New York Times from 2012 to 2015. Before entering the technology field, he held senior editorial positions at Newsweek and Business Week. In 1995, he co-created SmartMoney.com, one of the first financial news websites.

== Education and early career ==
Frons earned a B.A. in psychology from Brooklyn College (City University of New York) in 1977. While an undergraduate, he was a campus correspondent for The New York Times. After graduation, he worked as a stringer for The Times while employed at a newspaper in Rock Springs, Wyoming. He joined Newsweek in 1979 and held several senior editor positions at Business Week from 1984 to 1995.

== SmartMoney.com ==
From 1995 to early 2002, Frons served as editor and chief technology officer of SmartMoney.com, one of the first financial periodical websites. In 1998, the site launched the Map of the Market, a financial data visualization tool designed by Martin M. Wattenberg. The Map used a variant of the "treemap" technique pioneered by Ben Shneiderman, dividing the screen into rectangular tiles representing publicly traded companies. Each tile's area corresponded to a company's market capitalization, and its color indicated the stock price's change since the previous close. The tool introduced an algorithm designed to produce near-square tiles, improving legibility over earlier treemap implementations. Similar algorithms were independently developed around the same time by researchers including Jarke van Wijk.

The Map of the Market became one of SmartMoney.com's most-visited features and influenced the broader adoption of treemaps for financial data visualization.

SmartMoney.com received the American Society of Magazine Editors (ASME) National Magazine Award for Best Interactive Design in 2001, the Online News Association Award for Best Interactive Design in 2000, and the Web Marketing Association Award for Best Investing Web Site in 1999.

== Dow Jones and AOL Time Warner ==
From January 2002 to June 2003, Frons worked at AOL Time Warner, first as vice president and general manager of AOL Personal Finance and then as consulting editor for CNN Money. From 2003 to 2006, he was vice president and chief technology officer of the Consumer Media Group at Dow Jones & Company, overseeing technology for The Wall Street Journal Online and other consumer websites.

== The New York Times ==
Frons joined The New York Times in July 2006 as chief technology officer of digital operations, overseeing technology and product development for NYTimes.com and the company's other digital properties. In March 2012, he was promoted to chief information officer, with responsibility for all technology strategy and operations at the company.

During his tenure, Frons oversaw a transition from the company's proprietary web platform toward open-source software, adopting the LAMP stack and frameworks such as Ruby on Rails for new development. He described the approach as incremental, beginning with lower-traffic sections of the site before expanding to more prominent areas. He also created an internal team called Interactive News Technologies, embedding software engineers in the newsroom to build tools and rapid-development applications for news coverage.

Other initiatives during his time at The Times included the launch of Times Extra, a beta feature that aggregated headlines and links from third-party news sources and blogs and matched them with lead articles on the NYTimes.com home page, the implementation of the newspaper's digital paywall, and a content recommendation engine.

In 2014, Frons led the adoption of continuous delivery across the company's technology teams, working with consultancy ThoughtWorks. The initiative paused roughly half of active development projects during a three-month retraining and automation period. According to Frons, the results included a reduction in production errors by more than half and faster release cycles, with one team reducing its release time from seven days to 35 minutes. He also led a shift toward mobile-first development, reorganizing resources as mobile traffic grew from 30 percent of the total digital audience in 2013 to over 50 percent in 2014.

Frons left The New York Times in mid-2015.

== News Corp ==
Frons joined News Corp in 2015 as senior vice president, global head of mobile platform, and deputy head of technology. He was named interim chief technology officer in October 2016 after Paul Cheesbrough left to become CTO of 21st Century Fox, and was formally appointed to the role in May 2017. He served until 2019.

== Community involvement ==
Frons is a member of the Wainscott Citizens Advisory Committee in East Hampton, New York, where he has been involved in efforts to address aircraft noise from East Hampton Airport. In 2025–2026, he developed JPXWatch.org, a public data platform that tracks flights to and from the airport using data from FlightAware. The site maps airport operations by aircraft type, altitude, time of day, and seasonal pattern, and includes a feature allowing users to enter an address and view a personalized estimate of flight activity and noise exposure for that property. The noise estimates are modeled computationally based on terrain, altitude, and aircraft type, as the airport does not have physical noise-monitoring stations.

In January 2026, the Wainscott committee endorsed a plan presented by Frons identifying steps the town could take to impose operational restrictions at the airport while avoiding procedural issues that had blocked earlier efforts. Frons demonstrated the platform to East Hampton Airport officials and town leaders in March 2026. Members of the East Hampton Aviation Association subsequently engaged with Frons to review the platform's data sources and accuracy.

== Personal life ==
Frons lives in Wainscott, New York, with his wife, psychotherapist Merry Frons. He has two daughters. He is a cousin of Brian Frons, former president of ABC Daytime.
