= Krautreporter =

German online news website

- Available in: German
- Editor: Alexander von Streit
- Website: krautreporter.de
- Commercial: Yes
- Launched: 24 October 2014
- Current status: Online

Krautreporter is a German news website that has been online since October 2014. The financing of the platform was done by crowdfunding. This is to guarantee independent journalism without advertising. It was inspired by the Dutch news website, De Correspondent from the Netherlands, founded in 2013. Krautreporter publishes primarily long in-depth articles on various topics.
