= Open-source journalism =

Type of journalism

Open-source journalism, a close cousin to citizen journalism or participatory journalism, is a term coined in the title of a 1999 article by Andrew Leonard of Salon.com. Although the term was not actually used in the body text of Leonard's article, the headline encapsulated a collaboration between users of the internet technology blog Slashdot and a writer for Jane's Intelligence Review. The writer, Johan J. Ingles-le Nobel, had solicited feedback on a story about cyberterrorism from Slashdot readers, and then re-wrote his story based on that feedback and compensated the Slashdot writers whose information and words he used.

This early usage of the phrase clearly implied the paid use, by a mainstream journalist, of copyright-protected posts made in a public online forum. It thus referred to the standard journalistic techniques of news gathering and fact checking, and reflected a similar term—open-source intelligence—that was in use from 1992 in military intelligence circles.

The meaning of the term has since changed and broadened, and it is now commonly used to describe forms of innovative publishing of online journalism, rather than the sourcing of news stories by a professional journalist.

The term open-source journalism is often used to describe a spectrum on online publications: from various forms of semi-participatory online community journalism (as exemplified by projects such as the copyright newspaper NorthWest Voice), through to genuine open-source news publications (such as the Spanish 20 minutos, and Wikinews).

A relatively new development is the use of convergent polls, allowing editorials and opinions to be submitted and voted on. Over time, the poll converges on the most broadly accepted editorials and opinions. Examples of this are Opinionrepublic.com and Digg. Scholars are also experimenting with the process of journalism itself, such as open-sourcing the story skeletons that journalists build.

== Usage ==
At first sight, it would appear to many that blogs fit within the current meaning of open-source journalism. Yet the term's use of open source clearly currently implies the meaning as given to it by the open-source software movement; where the source code of programs is published openly to allow anyone to locate and fix mistakes or add new functions. Anyone may also freely take and re-use that source code to create new works, within set license parameters.

Given certain legal traditions of copyright, blogs may not be open source in the sense that one is prohibited from taking the blogger's words or visitor comments and re-using them in another form without breaching the author's copyright or making payment. However, many blogs draw on such material through quotations (often with links to the original material), and follow guidelines more comparable to research than media production.

Creative Commons is a licensing arrangement that is useful as a legal workaround for such an inherent structural dilemma intrinsic to blogging, and its fruition is manifest in the common practices of referencing another published article, image or piece of information via a hyperlink. Insofar as blog works can explicitly inform readers and other participants of the "openness" of their text via Creative Commons, they not only publish openly, but allow anyone to locate, critique, summarize etc. their works.

== Wiki journalism ==
Wiki journalism is a form of participatory journalism or crowdsourcing, which uses wiki technology to facilitate collaboration between users. It is a kind of collaborative journalism. The largest example of wiki journalism is Wikinews. According to Paul Bradshaw, there are five broad types of wiki journalism: second draft wiki journalism, a 'second stage' piece of journalism, during which readers can edit an article produced in-house; crowdsourcing wiki journalism, a means of covering material which could not have been produced in-house (probably for logistical reasons), but which becomes possible through wiki technology; supplementary wiki journalism, creating a supplement to a piece of original journalism, e.g. a tab to a story that says "Create a wiki for related stories"; open wiki journalism, in which a wiki is created as an open space, whose subject matter is decided by the user, and where material may be produced that would not otherwise have been commissioned; and logistical wiki journalism, involving a wiki limited to in-house contributors which enables multiple authorship, and may also facilitate transparency, and/or an ongoing nature.

=== Examples ===
Wikinews was launched in 2004 as an attempt to build an entire news operation on wiki technology. Where Wikinews – and indeed Wikipedia – has been most successful, however, is in covering large news events involving large numbers of people, such as Hurricane Katrina and the Virginia Tech shooting, where first-hand experience, or the availability of first-hand accounts, forms a larger part of the entry, and where the wealth of reportage makes a central "clearing house" valuable. Thelwall & Stuart identify Wikinews and Wikipedia as becoming particularly important during crises such as Hurricane Katrina, which "precipitate discussions or mentions of new technology in blogspace."

Mike Yamamoto notes that "In times of emergency, wikis are quickly being recognized as important gathering spots not only for news accounts but also for the exchange of resources, safety bulletins, missing-person reports and other vital information, as well as a meeting place for virtual support groups." He sees the need for community as the driving force behind this.

In June 2005, the Los Angeles Times decided to experiment with a "wikitorial" on the Iraq War, publishing their own editorial online but inviting readers to "rewrite" it using wiki technology. The experiment received broad coverage both before and after launch in both the mainstream media and the blogosphere. In editorial terms, the experiment was generally recognised as a failure.

In September 2005, Esquire used Wikipedia itself to "wiki" an article about Wikipedia by AJ Jacobs. The draft called on users to help Jacobs improve the article, with the intention of printing "before" and "after" versions of the piece in the printed magazine. He included some intentional mistakes to make the experiment "a little more interesting". The article received 224 edits in the first 24 hours, rising to 373 by 48 hours, and over 500 before further editing was suspended so the article could be printed.

In 2006, Wired also experimented with an article about wikis. When writer Ryan Singel submitted the 1,000-word draft to his editor, "instead of paring the story down to a readable 800 words, we posted it as-is to a SocialText-hosted wiki on 29 August, and announced it was open to editing by anyone willing to register." When the experiment closed, Singel noted that "there were 348 edits of the main story, 21 suggested headlines and 39 edits of the discussion pages. Thirty hyperlinks were added to the 20 in the original story." He continued that "one user didn't like the quotes I used from Ward Cunningham, the father of wiki software, so I instead posted a large portion of my notes from my interview on the site, so the community could choose a better one." Singel felt that the final story was "more accurate and more representative of how wikis are used" but not a better story than would have otherwise been produced:

"The edits over the week lack some of the narrative flow that a Wired News piece usually contains. The transitions seem a bit choppy, there are too many mentions of companies, and too much dry explication of how wikis work.

"It feels more like a primer than a story to me."

However, continued Singel, that didn't make the experiment a failure, and he felt the story "clearly tapped into a community that wants to make news stories better ... Hopefully, we'll continue to experiment to find ways to involve that community more."

In April 2010, the Wahoo Newspaper partnered with WikiCity Guides to extend its audience and local reach. "With this partnership, the Wahoo Newspaper provides a useful tool to connect with our readers, and for our readers to connect with one another to promote and spotlight everything Wahoo has to offer," said Wahoo Newspaper Publisher Shon Barenklau. Despite relatively little traffic as compared to its large scale, WikiCity Guides is recognized as the largest wiki in the world with over 13 million active pages.

=== Literature on wiki journalism ===
Andrew Lih places wikis within the larger category of participatory journalism, which also includes blogs, citizen journalism models such as OhMyNews and peer-to-peer publishing models such as Slashdot, and which, he argues "uniquely addresses an historic 'knowledge gap' – the general lack of content sources for the period between when the news is published and the history books are written."

Participatory journalism, he argues, "has recast online journalism not as simply reporting or publishing, but as a lifecycle, where software is crafted, users are empowered, journalistic content is created and the process repeats improves upon itself."

Francisco identifies wikis as a 'next step' in participatory journalism: "Blogs helped individuals publish and express themselves. Social networks allowed those disparate bloggers to be found and connected. Wikis are the platforms to help those who found one another be able to collaborate and build together."

=== Advantages ===
A Wiki can serve as the collective truth of the event, portraying the hundreds of viewpoints and without taxing any one journalist with uncovering whatever represents the objective truth in the circumstance.

Wikis allow news operations to effectively cover issues on which there is a range of opinion so broad that it would be difficult, if not impossible, to summarise effectively in one article alone. Examples might include local transport problems, experiences of a large event such as a music festival or protest march, guides to local restaurants or shops, or advice. The Wikivoyage site is one such example, "A worldwide travel guide written entirely by contributors who either live in the place they're covering or have spent enough time there to post relevant information."

Organisations willing to open up wikis to their audience completely may also find a way of identifying their communities' concerns: Wikipedia, for instance, notes Eva Dominguez "reflects which knowledge is most shared, given that both the content and the proposals for entries are made by the users themselves."

Internally, wikis also allow news operations to coordinate and manage a complex story which involves a number of reporters: journalists are able to collaborate by editing a single webpage that all have access to. News organisations interested in transparency might also publish the wiki 'live' as it develops, while the discussion space which accompanies each entry also has the potential to create a productive dialogue with users.

There are also clear economic and competitive advantages to allowing users to create articles. With the growth of low-cost micropublishing facilitated by the internet and blogging software in particular, and the convergence-fuelled entry into the online news market by both broadcasters and publishers, news organisations face increased competition from all sides. At the same time, print and broadcast advertising revenue is falling while competition for online advertising revenue is fierce and concentrated on a few major players: in the US, for instance, according to Jeffrey Rayport 99 percent of gross advertising money 2006 went to the top 10 websites.

Wikis offer a way for news websites to increase their reach, while also increasing the time that users spend on their website, a key factor in attracting advertisers. And, according to Dan Gillmor, "When [a wiki] works right, it engenders a community – and a community that has the right tools can take care of itself". A useful side-effect of community for a news organisation is reader loyalty.

Andrew Lih notes the importance of the "spirit of the open source movement" (2004b p6) in its development, and the way that wikis function primarily as "social software – acting to foster communication and collaboration with other users." Specifically, Lih attributes the success of the wiki model to four basic features: user friendly formatting; structure by convention, not enforced by software; "soft" security and ubiquitous access; and wikis transparency and edit history feature.

Student-run wikis provide opportunities to integrate learning by doing into a journalism education program.

=== Disadvantages ===
Shane Richmond identifies two obstacles that could slow down the adoption of news wikis – inaccuracy and vandalism:

- "vandalism remains the biggest obstacle I can see to mainstream media's adoption of wikis, particularly in the UK, where one libellous remark could lead to the publisher of the wiki being sued, rather than the author of the libel."
- "Meanwhile, the question of authority is the biggest obstacle to acceptance by a mainstream audience."

Writing in 2004, Lih also identified authority as an issue for Wikipedia: "While Wikipedia has recorded impressive accomplishments in three years, its articles have a mixed degree of quality because they are, by design, always in flux, and always editable. That reason alone makes people wary of its content."

Dan Gillmor puts it another way: "When vandals learn than someone will repair their damage within minutes, and therefore prevent the damage from being visible to the world, the bad guys tend to give up and move along to more vulnerable places." (2004, p. 149)

Attempts to address the security issue vary. Wikipedia's own entry on wikis again explains:

"For instance, some wikis allow unregistered users known as "IP addresses" to edit content, whilst others limit this function to just registered users. What most wikis do is allow IP editing, but privilege registered users with some extra functions to lend them a hand in editing; on most wikis, becoming a registered user is very simple and can be done in seconds, but detains the user from using the new editing functions until either some time passes, as in the English Wikipedia, where registered users must wait for three days after creating an account in order to gain access to the new tool, or until several constructive edits have been made in order to prove the user's trustworthiness and usefulness on the system, as in the Portuguese Wikipedia, where users require at least 15 constructive edits before authorization to use the added tools. Basically, "closed up" wikis are more secure and reliable but grow slowly, whilst more open wikis grow at a steady rate but result in being an easy target for vandalism."

Walsh (2007) quotes online media consultant Nico Macdonald on the importance of asking people to identify themselves:

"The key is the user's identity within the space – a picture of a person next to their post, their full name, a short bio and a link to their space online."

"A real community has, as New Labour would say, rights and responsibilities. You have to be accountable for yourself. Online, you only have the 'right' to express yourself. Online communities are not communities in a real sense – they're slightly delinquent. They allow or encourage delinquency."

Walsh (2007) argues that "Even if you don't plan on moderating a community, it's a good idea to have an editorial presence, to pop in and respond to users' questions and complaints. Apart from giving users the sense that they matter – and they really should – it also means that if you do have to take drastic measures and curtail (or even remove) a discussion or thread, it won't seem quite so much like the egregious action of some deus ex machina."

Ryan Singel of Wired also feels there is a need for an editorial presence, but for narrative reasons: "in storytelling, there's still a place for a mediator who knows when to subsume a detail for the sake of the story, and is accustomed to balancing the competing claims and interests of companies and people represented in a story."

'Edit wars' are another problem in wikis, where contributors continually overwrite each other's contributions due to a difference of opinion. The worst cases, notes Lih, "may require intervention by other community members to help mediate and arbitrate".

Eva Dominguez recognises the potential of wikis, but also the legal responsibilities that publishers must answer to: "The greater potential of the Internet to carry out better journalism stems from this collaboration, in which the users share and correct data, sources and facts that the journalist may not have easy access to or knowledge of. But the media, which have the ultimate responsibility for what is published, must always be able to verify everything. For example, in the case of third-party quotes included by collaborating users, the journalist must also check that they are true."

One of the biggest disadvantages may be readers' lack of awareness of what a wiki even is: only 2% of Internet users even know what a wiki is, according to a Harris Interactive poll (Francisco, 2006).

American columnist Bambi Francisco argues that it is only a matter of time before more professional publishers and producers begin to experiment with using "wiki-styled ways of creating content" in the same way as they have picked up on blogs.

The Telegraph's Web News Editor, Shane Richmond, wrote: "Unusually, it may be business people who bring wikis into the mainstream. That will prepare the ground for media experiments with wikis [and] I think it's a safe bet that a British media company will try a wiki before the end of the year."

Richmond added that The Telegraph was planning an internal wiki as a precursor to public experiments with the technology. "Once we have a feel for the technology, we will look into a public wiki, perhaps towards the end of the year [2007]."

== See also ==
- Civic journalism
- Citizen journalism
- Collaborative writing
- Indymedia
- Kuro5hin, a blog with an open peer review process
- History Commons
- Open publishing
- Peer review

== Bibliography ==
- Gillmor, Dan (2004) "We The Media", O'Reilly Media
- Lih, Andrew. "The Foundations of Participatory Journalism and the Wikipedia Project". Conference paper for the Association for Education in Journalism and Mass Communications Communication Technology and Policy Division, Toronto, Canada, 7 August 2004.
- Thelwall, Mike and Stuart, David. "RUOK? Blogging Communication Technologies During Crises". Journal of Computer-Mediated Communication, 2007, p523–548
- Walsh, Jason. "Build the perfect web community". .net Magazine, p39–43, no.165, August 2007
