= Ellen =

- Pronunciation: /ˈɛlən/

Other names
- Related names: Elena, Eleni, Helen, Helena, Eleanor, Helene

Ellen is a feminine given name. It was the 609th most popular name in the U.S. and the 17th in Sweden in 2004.

People named Ellen include:

== A ==
- Ellen Scheel Aalbu (born 1968), Norwegian footballer
- Ellen Adair (born 1988), American actress
- Ellen Adarna (born 1988), Filipino actress
- Ellen Wetherald Ahrens (1859–1935), American artist
- Ellen Ahrndt (1922–2009), American baseball player
- Ellen Ainsworth (1918–1944), United States Army nurse killed by German artillery
- Ellen Akins, American novelist
- Ellen Alaküla (1927–2011), Estonian actress
- Ellen Alemany, American business executive
- Ellen Alfsen (born 1965), Norwegian politician
- Ellen Palmer Allerton (1835–1893), American poet
- Ellen Allgurin (born 1994), Swedish tennis player
- Ellen Allien (born 1969), German electronic musician and music producer
- Ellen Altfest, American painter
- Ellen Ammann (1870–1932), German politician and activist
- Ellen Anckarsvärd (1833–1898), Swedish feminist
- Ellen Holager Andenæs (born 1947), Norwegian jurist
- Ellen Andersen (1898–1989), Danish museum curator
- Ellen Damgaard Andersen (born 1939), Danish physician and teacher
- Ellen Alice Anderson (1882–1978), New Zealand district nurse
- Ellen Anderson (born 1959), American politician
- Ellen Andrée (1856–1933), French model
- Ellen Angelina (born 1976), Indonesian badminton player
- Ellen Arkbro, Swedish composer
- Ellen E. Armstrong (1914–c. 1979), American stage magician
- Ellen Arnold (1858–1931), Australian missionary
- Ellen Arnstad (born 1965), Norwegian magazine editor
- Ellen Arruda, American mechanical engineer
- Ellen Arthur (1837–1880), wife of Chester A. Arthur, the 21st president of the United States
- Ellen Arthur jr. (1871–1915), daughter of Chester A. Arthur and First Lady Ellen Arthur
- Ellen Asher (born 1941), American science fiction editor
- Ellen Atkinson (1894–1965), Australian Aboriginal community leader
- Ellen Atlanta (born 1995), English non-fiction writer
- Ellen Auensen (born 1944), Norwegian illustrator
- Ellen Auerbach (1906–2004), German-born American photographer
- Ellen Auster, Canadian professor and author

== B ==
- Ellen Baake (born 1961), German mathematical biologist
- Ellen Babington (1877–1956), British archer
- Ellen Baker (disambiguation)
- Ellen Balaam (1891–c. 1985), Australian physician
- Ellen Ballance (c. 1846–1935), New Zealand suffragist and community leader
- Ellen Ballon (1898–1969), Canadian pianist
- Ellen Banda-Aaku (born 1965), Zambian writer
- Ellen Bang (1906–1981), German actress
- Ellen Banks (1938–2017), American painter
- Ellen Barber (born 1997), British heptathlete
- Ellen Bard (1949–2009), American politician
- Ellen Barkin (born 1954), American actress
- Ellen Jo Baron, American pathologist
- Ellen Barrett (born 1946), American priest
- Ellen Barron (1875–1951), Australian nurse
- Ellen Barry (disambiguation)
- Ellen Bass (born 1947), American poet and author
- Ellen Baumler (1949–2023), Montana historian and author
- Ellen Rae Simpson Beason (died 1985), American murder victim
- Ellen Beaumont (born 1985), Australian football player
- Ellen Beck (disambiguation)
- Ellen Becker (born 1960), German rower
- Ellen Beeman, American fantasy and science fiction author
- Ellen Beer (1926–2004), Swiss art historian
- Ellen Benediktson (born 1995), Swedish singer and songwriter
- Ellen Ida Benham (1871–1917), South Australian educationist
- Ellen Bepp (born 1970), American artist
- Ellen Berger (c. 1920 or 1921–1997), East German artistic gymnast
- Ellen Bergli (born 1945), Norwegian politician
- Ellen Bergman (1842–1921), Swedish musician and writer
- Ellen Berkenblit, American painter
- Ellen Berliner (1920–2011), American activist and feminist
- Ellen Bernstein (1953–2024), American rabbi and ecotourism
- Ellen S. Berscheid (1936–2025), American psychologist
- Ellen Bialystok, Canadian psychologist
- Ellen Blackwell (1864–1952), British writer, botanist and photographer
- Ellen A. Dayton Blair (1837–1926), social reformer and art teacher
- Ellen Blau (died 1985), American murder victim
- Ellen Blight (1834–1850), English lion tamer
- Ellen Blom (born 1979), Norwegian ski mountaineer
- Ellen Boakye, Ghanaian pediatric cardiologist
- Ellen Channing Day Bonaparte (1852–1924), wife of Charles Joseph Bonaparte
- Ellen Bontje (born 1958), Dutch equestrian
- Ellen Scripps Booth, American businessperson and philanthropist
- Ellen Botwin, American producer
- Ellen M. Bozman (1925–2009), American community activist and politician
- Ellen Braae, Danish landscape architect
- Ellen Brandom (born 1942), American politician
- Ellen Brandt-Forster (1866–1921), Austrian opera singer
- Ellen Braumüller (1910–1991), German track and field athlete
- Ellen Bravo, American activist and writer
- Ellen Breen (born 1963), American freestyle skier
- Ellen Brekken (born 1985), Norwegian jazz musician
- Ellen Alice Britton (1874–1959), British insect collector and nursery gardener
- Ellen Starr Brinton (c. 1886–1954), American pacifist, human rights activist and archivist
- Ellen Brockhöft (1893–1977), German figure skater
- Ellen Broe (1900–1994), Danish nurse and nursing educator
- Ellen Broidy, American LGBT rights activist
- Ellen Bromberg, American dance scholar
- Ellen Brooks (born 1946), American photographer
- Ellen Broselow, American linguist
- Ellen Brown (born 1945), American author, attorney, public speaker and advocate
- Ellen Brusewitz (1878–1952), American tennis player
- Ellen Bry (born 1951), American actress
- Ellen Bryan, American journalist
- Ellen Buckley (1915–2003), American military nurse
- Ellen Coolidge Burbank (1945–2023), American philanthropist
- Ellen Burka (1921–2016), Dutch and Canadian figure skater and coach
- Ellen Coolidge Burke (1901–1975), American librarian and academic
- Ellen Bree Burns (1923–2019), American judge
- Ellen Burrell (1850–1938), American mathematics professor
- Ellen Burstyn (born 1932), American actress
- Ellen Bushell (1884–1948), Irish textile artist and political activist
- Ellen Buttrick (born 1995), British Paralympic rower
- Ellen Byron, American mystery writer

== C ==
- Ellen Cahill (1863–1934), Irish-Australian street singer also known as "Killarney Kate"
- Ellen van der Cammen (born 1977), Dutch curler
- Ellen Moves Camp (1931–2008), American Indian activist
- Ellen Campbell, American politician
- Ellen O'Malley Camps, actor, producer and playwright
- Ellen M. Canavan, American politician
- Ellen Cantor (1961–2013), American artist
- Ellen Carey (born 1952), American artist and photographer
- Ellen Carlson (1929–2022), American journalist
- Ellen Maria Carpenter (1830–1908), American painter
- Ellen Carter (1762–1815), English artist
- Ellen Cassedy, workers' rights activist
- Ellen Cassidy (1888–1960), American stage and screen actress
- Ellen Cerreta, American materials scientist
- Ellen Chan (born 1966), Hong Kong actress and singer
- Ellen Chaplin, English actress
- Ellen Chapman, British suffragist and politician
- Ellen Chapman (lion tamer) (1831–1899), British circus performer and lion tamer
- Ellen Charry, American theologian and author
- Ellen Cheeseman (1848–1928), New Zealand artist
- Ellen Cheever (1949–2021), American interior designer
- Ellen Chenoweth, American casting director
- E. Kitch Childs (1937–1993), American clinical psychologist
- Ellen Christensen (1913–1998), Danish resistance member
- Ellen Christenson (born 1938), American singer
- Ellen Christi (born 1958), American jazz musician
- Ellen Christine Christiansen (born 1964), Norwegian politician
- Ellen Christo (born 1965), American judge
- Ellen Christoffersen (born 1972), Greenlandic politician
- Ellen Church (1904–1965), American aviation pioneer
- Ellen Clacy, English writer and journalist
- Ellen Louise Clacy, English artist
- Ellen Clapsaddle (1865–1934), American illustrator
- Ellen Clark (1915–1988), Australian carcinologist, influenza researcher and naturalist
- Ellen Clark-King, British-Canadian Anglican priest and academic
- Ellen Garrison Jackson Clark (1823–1892), American civil rights activist
- Ellen Clayton (disambiguation)
- Ellen Cleghorne (born 1965), American comedian and actress
- Ellen Mary Clerke (1840–1906), Irish poet, linguist and journalist
- Ellen Cobb (born 1940), retired British judoka
- Ellen Melicent Cobden (1848–1914), British writer and suffragist
- Ellen Cohen, American politician
- Ellen Gertrude Cohen (1860–1946), British painter and illustrator
- Ellen Coleman (disambiguation)
- Ellen Maria Colfax (1836–1911), Second Lady of the United States
- Ellen Conford (1942–2015), American novelist
- Ellen Conners, American politician
- Ellen Contini-Morava, linguistic anthropologist
- Ellen Randolph Coolidge (1796–1876), granddaughter of Thomas Jefferson
- Ellen Rankin Copp (1853–1901), American sculptor
- Ellen Corbett (1954–2024), American politician
- Ellen Corby (1911–1999), American actress
- Ellen Corkrum, Liberian philanthropist, politician and convicted criminal
- Ellen Covey (born 1947), American neurobiologist and perfumer
- Ellen C. Covito, Argentine composer
- Ellen Craft (1826–1891), American fugitive slave and abolitionist
- Ellen Walker Craig-Jones (1906–2000), American politician
- Ellen Craswell (1932–2008), American politician
- Ellen Crawford (born 1951), American actress
- Ellen Crocker (1872–1962), British suffragette
- Ellen Crowe (c. 1847–1930), New Zealand homemaker and community leader
- Ellen Crowley-Suyematsu (1916–2001), American politician
- Ellen Cuffe, Countess of Desart (1857–1933), Irish politician and company director
- Ellen Currie (c. 1930–2012), American author

== D ==
- Ellen Lawson Dabbs (1853–1908), American physician, activist and writer
- Ellen Dahl (1886–1959), Danish writer and philanthropist
- Ellen Dahrendorf, British historian and translator
- Ellen ten Damme (born 1967), Dutch actress and musician
- Ellen Dannin, American law professor
- Ellen Wordsworth Darwin (1856–1903), British academic
- Ellen Datlow (born 1949), American editor and anthropologist
- Ellen David, Canadian actress
- Ellen Davis (disambiguation)
- Ellen Davitt (c. 1812–1879), English-born Australian writer
- Ellen Dawson (1900–1967), Scottish-American activist
- Ellen DeGeneres (born 1958), American comedian, actress, and talk-show host
- Ellen Demming (1922–2002), American actress
- Ellen Louise Demorest (1824–1898), American publisher and businesswoman
- Ellen Demuth (born 1982), German politician
- Ellen Desailly (1857–1939), Australian charity worker
- Ellen Dickson (c. 1819–1878), English ballad composer
- Ellen Battelle Dietrick (c. 1847–1895), American suffragist and author
- Ellen Diggs, American anthropologist
- Ellen van Dijk (born 1987), Dutch road and track cyclist
- Ellen Dissanayake (born c. 1935), American anthropologist and author
- Ellen D'Oench (1930–2009), American art historian and curator
- Ellen Dolan (born 1955), American actress
- Ellen Dougherty (1844–1919), New Zealand nurse
- Ellen Douglas (1921–2012), American novelist
- Ellen Albertini Dow (1913–2015), American actress and drama coach
- Ellen Mary Patrick Downing (1828–1869), Irish nationalist, poet and nun
- Ellen Drew (1914–2003), American actress
- Ellen Weinberg Dreyfus, American rabbi
- Ellen Driscoll (born 1953), American artist
- Ellen R.M. Druffel, American oceanographer
- Ellen Dubin, Canadian actress
- Ellen DuBois (born 1947), American historian
- Ellen Duncan (1862–1937), Irish art gallery director and critic
- Ellen Dunham-Jones (born 1959), architectural educator and urbanist
- Ellen Griffin Dunne (1932–1997), American actor and activist

== E ==
- Ellen Eagle, American painter
- Ellen Eglin, African-American inventor
- Ellen Ehni, German journalist
- Ellen Einan (1931–2013), Norwegian poet and illustrator
- Ellen Eischen, American mathematician
- Ellen Ek (born 1997), Swedish diver
- Ellen Ekkart, Belgian dancer and choreographer
- Ellen van Eldik (born 1960), Dutch footballer
- Ellen Elias-Bursać, American scholar and translator
- Ellen Ellis (disambiguation)
- Ellen Elzerman (born 1971), Dutch swimmer
- Ellen Russell Emerson (1837–1907), American author and ethnologist
- Ellen Emilie (born 2001), Danish politician
- Ellen Eriksen (born 1972), Norwegian politician
- Ellen Estes (born 1978), American water polo player

== F ==
- Ellen Hackl Fagan, American artist
- Ellen Fairclough (1905–2004), Canadian politician
- Ellen Falkner (born 1979), British bowls player
- Ellen Fanning (born 1967), Australian journalist
- Ellen Birgitte Farbrot (born 1984), Norwegian dressage rider
- Ellen Farner (born 1941), German actress
- Ellen Frances Burpee Farr (1840–1907), American painter
- Ellen Faull (1918–2008), American operatic soprano
- Ellen Favorin (1853–1919), Finnish painter
- Ellen Fechner (1895–1951), German novelist and screenwriter
- Ellen Feld, American writer
- Ellen Feldman, American novelist
- Ellen Aline Fenner (1889–?), American botanist
- Ellen Fetter, American computer scientist and chaos theory researcher
- Ellen Fiedler (born 1958), East German hurdler
- Ellen Fife (born 1997), Australian lawn bowler
- Ellen Thayer Fisher (1847–1911), American botanical illustrator
- Ellen Eliza Fitz, American inventor
- Ellen Fitzhugh (1942–2023), American musical theatre director
- Ellen Fitzsimon (c. 1805–1883), Irish poet
- Ellen Foley (born 1951), American singer and actress
- Ellen Forney (born 1968), American cartoonist
- Ellen Thorneycroft Fowler (1860–1929), English writer
- Ellen France, New Zealand jurist
- Ellen Francke (1943–1990), Norwegian poet and novelist
- Ellen Frank (disambiguation)
- Ellen Frankel, American writer
- Ellen Franz (1839–1923), German pianist and actress
- Ellen Sulley Fray (1832–c. 1903), British-American social reformer
- Ellen G. Friedman, American author, editor and professor
- Ellen Fries (1855–1900), Swedish feminist and writer, first woman to be awarded a PhD in Sweden
- Ellen Frothingham (1835–1902), American translator
- Ellen Fullman, American classical composer
- Ellen V. Futter (born 1949), American museum administrator

== G ==
- Ellen Gabriel, Canadian activist and artist
- Ellen Galford (born 1947), American-born Scottish writer
- Ellen Galinsky (born 1942), American writer
- Ellen Gallagher (born 1965), American artist
- Ellen Garwood (1903–1993), American philanthropist
- Ellen Maria Huntington Gates (1835–1920), American poet
- Ellen Geer (born 1941), American actress, acting teacher and theatre director
- Ellen Gerstein, American actress
- Ellen Gerstell (born 1954), American voice actress
- Ellen Gethner (born 1960), American mathematician and computer scientist
- Ellen Gilbert (1837–1900), American chess player
- Ellen Gilchrist (1935–2024), American novelist, short story writer, and poet
- Ellen Githmark, Norwegian female curler
- Ellen Gittelsohn (born 1945), American television director
- Ellen Glasgow (1873–1945), American novelist
- Ellen Gleditsch (1879–1968), Norwegian radiochemist
- Ellen F. Golden (born 1946), American nonprofit executive
- Ellen Goldsmith-Vein, American television and film producer
- Ellen Goodman (born 1941), American journalist and writer
- Ellen Lakshmi Goreh (1853–1937), Indian poet
- Ellen Gorman (born 1955), American judge
- Ellen Gottschalch (1894–1981), Danish actress
- Ellen Graber, American-Israeli research scientist
- Ellen Louise Graham (born 1943), American journalist
- Ellen Granberg, American academic administrator
- Ellen Grant (1855–1922), the third child and only daughter of Ulysses S. Grant, 18th president of the United States
- Ellen Greenberg (1983–2011), American teacher, died either of suicide or homicide
- Ellen Greene (born 1951), American singer and actress
- Ellen Greenwood (1837–1917), New Zealand teacher and social worker
- Ellen Grimshaw, Australian actor
- Ellen Grindvold (born 1946), Norwegian basketball and tennis player
- Ellen R. Gritz (born 1944), American psychologist and cancer researcher
- Ellen Gronemeyer (born 1979), German painter
- Ellen Gruenbaum, American anthropologist
- Ellen Gulbranson (1863–1947), Swedish operatic soprano
- Ellen Gustafson, American businesswoman
- Ellen Gwaradzimba (1960–2021), Zimbabwean politician

== H ==
- Ellen Hagan, Ghanaian entrepreneur
- Ellen Hagen (1873–1967), Swedish suffragette and politician
- Ellen Day Hale (1855–1940), American impressionist painter and printmaker
- Ellen Hall (1923–1999), American actress
- Ellen Roosval von Hallwyl (1867–1952), Swedish sculptor
- Ellen Halpenny (born 1990), New Zealand netball international
- Ellen Hamaker (born 1974), Dutch-American psychologist and statistician
- Ellen Hambro (born 1964), Norwegian civil servant
- Ellen Hamilton (1889–1970), Swedish fencer
- Ellen Hamlin (1835–1925), Second Lady of the United States
- Ellen Hammer (1921–2001), American historian
- Ellen Hancock, American businesswoman
- Ellen Handy (born 1961), American art critic and historian
- Ellen Hanley (1926–2007), American actress
- Ellen Hansell (1869–1937), American tennis player
- Ellen Harley (born 1946), American politician
- Ellen Hart (born 1949), American novelist
- Ellen Hartman (1860–1945), Swedish actress
- Ellen Harvey, American-British conceptual artist
- Ellen Douglass Hatch, Australian actress
- Ellen Inga O. Hætta (1953–2023), Norwegian-Sami school principal and politician
- Ellen Hayes (1851–1930), American mathematician
- Ellen Heine (1907–1989), New Zealand botanist, photographer and painter
- Ellen Hellmann (1908–1982), South African social anthropologist
- Ellen Roy Herzfelder, American former politician
- Ellen Hewett (1843–1926), New Zealand writer
- Ellen Charlotte Higgins (1871–1951), British teacher
- Ellen Hight (born 1981), Zambian swimmer
- Ellen Hildreth, American computer scientist
- Ellen Hillingsø (born 1967), Danish actress
- Ellen Hinsey (born 1960), American poet
- Ellen 't Hoen (born 1960), Dutch lawyer and Médecins sans Frontières director
- Ellen Hogerwerf (born 1989), Dutch rower
- Ellen Lipton Hollander (born 1949), American judge
- Ellen Hollman (born 1983), American actress
- Ellen Hollond (1822–1884), English writer and philanthropist
- Ellen Holly (1931–2023), American actress
- Ellen Hoog (born 1986), Dutch field hockey player
- Ellen Sturgis Hooper (1812–1848), American poet
- Ellen Hooton, British child laborer
- Ellen Hopkins (born 1955), American writer
- Ellen Evert Hopman (born 1952), American author, herbalist, lay homeopath, lecturer and mental health counselor
- Ellen Horn (born 1951), Norwegian actress, theater director, and politician
- Ellen Hørup (1871–1953), Danish journalist and non-fiction writer
- Ellen Hovde (1925–2023), American documentarian
- Ellen Jane Hover (died 1977), American murder victim
- Ellen Clementine Howarth, American poet
- Ellen Howell (born 1961), American astronomer and planetary scientist
- Ellen Huet, American journalist
- Ellen Hughes (1862–1927), Welsh-language writer, temperance reformer and suffragist
- Ellen Hughes-Cromwick, American economist
- Ellen Kent Hughes (1893–1979), Australian medical practitioner
- Ellen Hunnicutt (1931–2003), American author
- Ellen Hunter (born 1968), Welsh racing cyclist
- Ellen Hutchins (1785–1815), Irish botanist, writer and illustrator
- Ellen Segal Huvelle (born 1948), American judge

== I ==
- Ellen Idelson (1961–2003), American television producer
- Ellen Iden (1897–1961), Norwegian artist
- Ellen M. Immergut, political scientist
- Ellen Ingvadóttir (born 1953), Icelandic swimmer
- Ellen Isefiær (1899–1985), Norwegian actress and stage director

== J ==
- Ellen Jaffee (born 1944), American politician
- Ellen Jansen (born 1992), Dutch footballer
- Ellen Jarabková (born 2009), Czech ice hockey player
- Ellen Jansø (1907–1981), Danish actress
- Ellen Jeffreys (1827–1904), New Zealand artist
- Ellen Jens (1940–2023), Dutch television director and producer
- Ellen Johnson (disambiguation)
- Ellen Johnston (c. 1835–1874?), Scottish power-loom weaver and poet
- Ellen Jokikunnas (born 1976), Finnish model and television host
- Ellen Jolin (1854–1939), Swedish artist
- Ellen Jones (disambiguation)
- Ellen Jorgensen (born 1955), American molecular biologist and community science advocate
- Ellen Jørgensen, Danish historian and librarian
- Ellen José (c. 1951–2017), Australian photographer
- Ellen Joyce (1832–1924), British organizer of women's emigration
- Ellen Juntti (born 1958), Swedish politician

== K ==
- Ellen Kaarma (1928–1973), Estonian actress
- Ellen Kaisse, American linguist
- Ellen Kandeler (born 1957), German biologist and agricultural scientist
- Ellen S. Kappel, American oceanographer
- Ellen Karcher (born 1964), American politician
- Ellen Karlsson (born 1994), Swedish footballer
- Ellen Kean (1805–1880), English actress
- Ellen Keane (born 1995), Irish Paralympic swimmer
- Ellen J. Kennedy, American academic
- Ellen Kent, British theatre director
- Ellen Goosenberg Kent, American film producer and director
- Ellen Ketterson, American biologist
- Ellen Kettle (1922–1999), Australian nurse and midwife
- Ellen Key (1849–1926), Swedish feminist writer and suffragette
- Ellen Kidd (c. 1852–1932), American suffragist and businesswoman
- Ellen Kiessling (born 1968), German track and field athlete
- Ellen Y.D. Kim, South Korean film producer
- Ellen King (1909–1994), Scottish swimmer
- Ellen Olney Kirk (1842–1928), American novelist
- Ellen Kirkman, American mathematician
- Ellen Kjellberg (born 1948), Norwegian dancer
- Ellen Klages (born 1954), American writer
- Ellen Kleman, Swedish writer and women's rights activist
- Ellen Mary Knox (1858–1924), Canadian educator and school administrator
- Ellen Kooi (born 1962), Dutch artist and photographer
- Ellen Kooijman, Dutch geoscientist
- Ellen Kort, American poet
- Ellen Ernst Kossek, American academic and social scientist
- Ellen Krause (1905–1990), Danish artist
- Ellen Krauss (born 2000), Swedish singer
- Ellen Krug (born 1956), American lawyer
- Ellen Kuhl, professor at Stanford University
- Ellen Kuipers (born 1971), Dutch field hockey player
- Ellen J. Kullman (born 1956), American business executive, CEO of DuPont
- Ellen Kuras (born 1959), American cinematographer and film director
- Ellen Kürti (1903–1966), Hungarian actress
- Ellen Kushner (born 1955), American writer
- Ellen Kuzwayo (1914–2006), South African women's rights activist and politician

== L ==
- Ellen La Motte (1873–1961), American nurse, journalist and author
- Ellen Lahn (1918–2004), Norwegian politician
- Ellen Land-Weber (born 1943), American photographer and author
- Ellen van Langen (born 1966), Dutch middle-distance runner
- Ellen Langer (born 1947), American psychologist
- Ellen Langwith, English businesswoman
- Ellen Lanyon (1926–2013), American painter
- Ellen Hodakova Larsson, Swedish fashion designer
- Ellen Lax (born 1885, date of death unknown), German physicist
- Ellen Petry Leanse (born 1958), American author and businesswoman
- Ellen Lee (born 1957), Singaporean politician
- Ellen Leibenluft, American psychiatrist
- Ellen Lenneck (1851–1880), German novelist
- Ellen Leonard (1933–2022), Canadian theologian and Roman Catholic religious sister
- Ellen Lesperance (born 1971), American artist and educator
- Ellen Levine, American media executive
- Ellen Levy, American multimedia artist
- Ellen Lewin, anthropologist and professor
- Ellen Lewis, American casting director
- Ellen Liiger (1918–1987), Estonian actress
- Ellen Kate Limouzin (1870–1950), British suffragette, socialist, music hall performer, writer and Esperanto speaker
- Ellen Lipton (born 1967), American politician from Michigan
- Ellen Liston, Australian writer and educator
- Ellen Litman, American novelist
- Ellen Löfqvist (born 1997), Swedish footballer
- Ellen Lohr (born 1965), German racing driver
- Ellen Margrethe Løj (born 1948), Danish diplomat
- Ellen Longmire, American applied physicist and mechanical engineer
- Ellen Joyce Loo (1986–2018), Hong Kong musician, singer-songwriter and record producer
- Ellen Lord, American businesswoman and government official
- Ellen Jane Lorenz (1907–1996), American composer
- Ellen Lumpkin, American neuroscientist
- Ellen Lupton, American graphic designer

== M ==
- Ellen MacArthur (born 1976), British yachtswoman
- Ellen MacGregor (1906–1954), American novelist
- Ellen J. MacKenzie, American scientist and academic administrator
- Ellen MacKinnon (1926–2001), Canadian politician
- Ellen Maggs (born 1996), English footballer
- Ellen Malcolm (born 1947), American activist
- Ellen Malos (1937–2023), Australian-British scholar and activist
- Ellen Manderfield (1916–1999), American industrial designer
- Ellen van Maris (born 1957), Dutch bodybuilder
- Ellen Markman, American psychologist
- Ellen Marlow (born 1994), American actress
- Ellen Marriage (1865–1946), English female novelist
- Ellen Marsvin (1572–1649), Danish noble, landowner and county administrator
- Ellen Martin (disambiguation)
- Ellen Marx (disambiguation)
- Ellen Masaki, American music teacher and pianist
- Ellen Mason (disambiguation)
- Ellen Buckingham Mathews (1849–1920), English novelist
- Ellen Mattson (born 1962), Swedish writer
- Ellen Mattsson (born 1973), Swedish actress
- Ellen Maycock (born 1950), American mathematician
- Ellen McArthur (1862–1927), British economic historian
- Ellen McCaleb, American artist
- Ellen E. McCarthy, American intelligence officer
- Ellen McCarthy, American urban planner
- Ellen McCormack (1926–2011), American politician
- Ellen McCourt (born 1984), British trade unionist
- Ellen McCulloch (1930–2005), Australian nature writer
- Ellen McCullough (1908–1985), British trade unionist
- Ellen McElduff (born 1964), Canadian actress
- Ellen Barnes McGinnis (1842–1890), American enslaved woman
- Ellen McGrattan (born 1962), American economist
- Ellen McIlwaine (1945–2021), American musician
- Ellen McLain (born 1952), American voice actress
- Ellen McLaughlin (born 1957), American playwright and actress
- Ellen McMahon (born 1951), American graphic designer and professor
- Ellen Meade, American beauty pageant titleholder
- Ellen Meara, American health economist
- Ellen Meijers (born c.1971), Dutch video game music composer
- Ellen Meliesie (born 1963), Dutch rower
- Ellen Meloy (1946–2004), American nature writer
- Ellen Melville (1882–1946), New Zealand politician
- Ellen Louise Mertz (1896–1987), Danish geologist
- Ellen von Meyern (1881–c. 1912), New Zealand painter
- Ellen Miles (born 1957), American writer
- Ellen Miller (disambiguation)
- Ellen Mirojnick (born 1949), American costume designer
- Ellen Mitchell (philosopher), American philosopher and educator
- Ellen Mitchell, Norwegian handball player
- Ellen Moffat (born 1954), Canadian media artist
- Ellen Moir, American nonprofit executive
- Ellen 'Maposholi Molapo, Mosotho politician
- Ellen Molekane (born 1953), South African politician
- Ellen Molloy (born 2004), Irish footballer
- Ellen Montalba (1842–1930), British artist
- Ellen Moons, Belgian materials scientist and academic
- Ellen Bryan Moore (1912–1999), American politician
- Ellen Moran (born 1966), American politician
- Ellen More, 16th-century African servant at the Scottish court
- Ellen Morphonios (1929–2002), American judge
- Ellen Mortyn (c. 1834–1859), English actress
- Ellen Mosley-Thompson, American glaciologist and climatologist
- Ellen Moyer (born 1936), American politician
- Ellen Muehlberger, American scholar
- Ellen Mundinger (born 1955), German high jumper
- Ellen Murphy (born 1995), Irish rugby player
- Ellen Murray, American painter
- Ellen Spencer Mussey (1850–1936), American lawyer
- Ellen Musson (1867–1960), British nurse
- Ellen Muth (born 1981), American actress

== N ==
- Ellen Torelle Nagler (1870–1965), American biologist, author, lecturer
- Ellen Nakashima, American journalist
- Ellen Namhila, vice rector of the University of Namibia
- Ellen van Neerven, Australian Aboriginal writer, educator and editor
- Ellen Nielsen (1871–1960), Danish missionary and educator
- Ellen Niit (1928–2016), Estonian children's writer, poet and translator
- Ellen Nikolaysen (born 1951), Norwegian actress
- Ellen Nisbeth (born 1987), Swedish violist
- Ellen Noble (born 1995), American cyclist
- Ellen Kyle Noel (1815–1873), Irish Canadian writer
- Ellen Trane Nørby (born 1980), Danish politician
- Ellen Gracie Northfleet (born 1948), Brazilian judge
- Ellen Nowak, American attorney and politician
- Ellen Nussey (1817–1897), British writer
- Ellen Nyman (born 1971), Swedish actress, performance artist and theatre director

== O ==
- Ellen Ochoa (born 1958), American engineer and astronaut
- Ellen O'Doherty (1894–1983), Australian religious, superior general of Sisters of Charity
- Ellen Oh, American author
- Ellen O'Keefe, Irish-American nurse and immigrant
- Ellen O'Leary, Irish poet
- Ellen Oléria (born 1982), Brazilian singer
- Ellen Oliver (disambiguation)
- Ellen Sofie Olsvik (born 1962), Norwegian orienteer
- Ellen Oppenheimer (born 1952), American quilter
- Ellen Organ (1903–1908), Irish child mystic
- Ellen Sewall Osgood (1822–1892), American amateur geologist
- Ellen Osiier (1890–1962), Danish Olympic fencing foil champion
- Ellen Owen (born 1963), American diver

== P ==
- Ellen Page, former name of Elliot Page (born 1987), Canadian actor
- Ellen Webster Palmer (1839–1918), early advocate for child labor laws
- Ellen Palmstierna, Swedish activist
- Ellen Paneok (1959–2008), first indigenous Alaskan woman to become a licensed pilot
- Ellen Pao (born 1970), American lawyer, former CEO of Reddit
- Ellen Mary Paraman, governess to George Curzon
- Ellen Park (born 1972), American lawyer and Democratic Party politician
- Ellen Parker (actress) (born 1949), American actress
- Ellen Pau, Chinese artist, curator and researcher
- Ellen Paul, American politician
- Ellen M. Pawlikowski, United States Air Force general
- Ellen Nora Payne (1865–1962), Australian woodcarver
- Ellen E. Peck (c. 1830s—after 1925?), American criminal
- Ellen Peck (1942–1995), American feminist and writer
- Ellen Birgitte Pedersen (born 1955), Norwegian politician
- Ellen Hart Peña (born 1958), American lawyer and athlete
- Ellen Pence (1948–2011), American sociologist and activist
- Ellen Pennock (born 1992), Canadian triathlete
- Ellen Perez (born 1995), Australian tennis player
- Ellen E. Perry, American classicist
- Ellen Perry, American film director
- Ellen Peters (disambiguation)
- Ellen Dorrit Petersen (born 1975), Norwegian actress
- Ellen Peterson (1923–2011), American activist
- Ellen Petri (born 1982), Belgian beauty pageant
- Ellen Phelan, American painter
- Ellen Picard, Canadian former law professor and judge
- Ellen Pickering (c. 1802–1843), British novelist
- Ellen Pinsent (1866–1949), British mental health worker
- Ellen Plessow (1891–1967), German actress
- Ellen Pollock (1903–1997), British actress
- Ellen Pompeo (born 1969), American actress
- Ellen Popeyus, Dutch former footballer
- Ellen Port (born 1961), American amateur golfer and former coach
- Ellen Potter, American author
- Ellen Culver Potter (1871–1958), American physician
- Ellen Preis (1912–2007), German-born Austrian Olympic champion foil fencer
- Ellen Prendergast (1918–1999), Ireland's first female professional archaeologist
- Ellen Price (1878–1968), Danish actress and ballerina
- Ellen Prince (1944–2010), American linguist
- Ellen Prince (costume designer), American actress and costume designer
- Ellen Prom (1865–c. 1925), Norwegian actress
- Ellen Bernard Thompson Pyle (1876–1936), American illustrator

== Q ==
- Ellen Schulz Quillin (1887–1970), American botanist, author, educator and museum director

== R ==
- Ellen Emmet Rand (1875–1941), American painter
- Ellen Henrietta Ranyard (1810–1879), English writer and missionary
- Ellen Rapoport, American television writer, producer and director
- Ellen Raskin (1928–1984), American writer and illustrator
- Ellen Rathje, American civil engineer
- Ellen Ratner, American news analyst
- Ellen Ravenscroft, American painter
- Ellen Read, American politician
- Ellen Elizabeth Reed (c. 1916–2020), British code-breaker
- Ellen P. Reese (1926–1997), American psychologist
- Ellen Reid (born 1966), Canadian musician
- Ellen Reid (composer), American composer
- Ellen Renfroe (born 1992), American softball player
- Ellen Swallow Richards (1842–1911), American industrial and environmental chemist
- Ellen Riloff, American computer scientist
- Ellen Ringier (1951–2025), Swiss publisher
- Ellen Robbins, American botanical illustrator
- Ellen Roberts (born 1959), Colorado State Representative
- Ellen Roberts (softball) (born 1992), Australian softball and baseball player
- Ellen Robertson, British actress and writer
- Ellen Robinson (1840–1912), British teacher, Quaker minister, feminist and peace activist
- Ellen Rocche (born 1979), Brazilian actress
- Ellen Roche (born 1979), Brazilian actress and model
- Ellen Rochefort (born 1954), Canadian long-distance runner
- Ellen Rockmore, American politician
- Ellen Rometsch (born 1936), German club hostess
- Ellen Roosevelt (1868–1954), American tennis player
- Ellen Mary Rope (1855–1934), British sculptor
- Ellen Alida Rose (1843–1???), American agriculturist, suffragist
- Ellen Roseman, Canadian journalist
- Ellen Rosenblum (born 1951), American politician
- Ellen Rosenbush, American journalist
- Ellen Rothenberg (disambiguation)
- Ellen G. K. Rubin, American book collector
- Ellen Sergeant Rude (1838–1916), American writer and poet
- Ellen Ryan (c. 1851–1920), Australian publican and entrepreneur
- Ellen Rydelius (1885–1957), Swedish translator and writer

== S ==
- Ellen Clara Sabin (1850–1949), American educator
- Ellen Samyn (born 1980), Belgian politician
- Ellen Sandelin (1862–1907), Swedish physician
- Ellen Sandell (born 1984), Australian environmentalist and politician
- Ellen A. Sandimanie, Liberian city official
- Ellen Sandweiss (born 1958), American actress
- Ellen Santana (born 1998), Brazilian judoka
- Ellen Sarjeant (1868–1939), New Zealand artist, curator, registrar and philanthropist
- Ellen Sauerbrey (born 1937), American politician
- Ellen Savage (192–1985), Australian army nurse and hospital matron
- Ellen Mills Scarbrough (1900–1983), Liberian politician
- Ellen Schlichting (born 1957), Norwegian gastroenterological surgeon
- Ellen Schmidt (1922–1997), German art director
- Ellen Schrecker (born 1938), American historian
- Ellen Schreiber (born 1967), American young adult fiction author
- Ellen Schulten-Baumer (born 1979), German dressage rider
- Ellen Schutt (born 1995), American politician
- Ellen Isham Schutt (1873–1955), American botanical illustrator
- Ellen Schwamm (born 1934), American novelist
- Ellen Schwanneke (1906–1972), German dancer and actress
- Ellen Schwiers (1930–2019), German actress
- Ellen Browning Scripps (1836–1932), American journalist and philanthropist
- Ellen Seip (born 1949), Norwegian civil servant
- Ellen Churchill Semple (1863–1932), American geographer
- Ellen Shade (born 1944), American opera singer
- Ellen Sharples (1769–1849), British artist
- Ellen Eddy Shaw (1874–1960), American writer
- Ellen Sheidlin (born 1994), Russian photoblogger and fashion designer
- Ellen Ruppel Shell, American journalist
- Ellen Shenton, English sculptor
- Ellen Shine (1891–1993), survivor of the RMS Titanic
- Ellen Shipley (born 1949), American musician and songwriter
- Ellen Biddle Shipman (1869–1950), American landscape architect
- Ellen Shub (1946–2019), American photojournalist
- Ellen Shumsky, American lesbian feminist activist
- Ellen Sidransky, American pediatrician and clinical geneticist
- Ellen Silbergeld, American academic and biologist
- Ellen Rosalie Simon (1916–2011), Canadian artist
- Ellen Simpson, Canadian writer
- Ellen Sinding (1899–1980), Norwegian actress and dancer
- Ellen Johnson Sirleaf (born 1938), President of Liberia
- Ellen Skerritt (born 1994), Australian cyclist
- Ellen Aslaksdatter Skum (1827–1895), Norwegian Sami reindeer herder
- Ellen Sletten, American chemist
- Ellen Smith (disambiguation)
- Ellen M. Cyr Smith, American author and educator
- Ellen Smyly (1815–1901), Irish charity worker
- Ellen Spertus, American computer scientist
- Ellen Spiegel, American politician
- Ellen Spijkstra (born 1957), Dutch ceramic artist and photographer
- Ellen S. Spinden (1897–1985), American archaeologist
- Ellen Spiro, American film director
- Ellen Sprunger (born 1986), Swiss athlete
- Ellen Stager (1865–1951), American heiress and British peeress
- Ellen Gates Starr (1859–1940), American social activist
- Ellen Mary Stawell-Brown, English tennis and badminton player
- Ellen Steiber, American novelist
- Ellen Margrethe Stein (1893–1979), Danish actress
- Ellen Stekert (born 1935), professor of English and folklorist
- Ellen Stevenson (née Borden, 1907–1972), American socialite and First Lady of Illinois
- Ellen Stewart (disambiguation)
- Ellen Stiefler (born 1958), American agent, producer and lawyer
- Ellen Stimson (born 1962), American author
- Ellen Stofan (born 1961), Under Secretary for Science and Research at The Smithsonian
- Ellen Stone (disambiguation)
- Ellen Story (born 1941), American politician
- Ellen Sulzberger Straus (1925–1995), American businesswoman and philanthropist
- Ellen Streidt (born 1952), East German sprinter
- Ellen E. Strong, American malacologist
- Ellen Sussman, American novel writer
- Ellen Svinhufvud (1869–1953), First Lady of Finland
- Ellen Swift (born 1972), British archaeologist

== T ==
- Ellen Tamaki (born 1992), American actress
- Ellen Tauscher (1951–2019), American politician, Under Secretary of State
- Ellen Taylor, Irish author
- Ellen Ternan (1839–1914), English actress
- Ellen Terry (1847–1928), English stage actress
- Ellen Thesleff (1869–1954), Finnish painter
- Ellen Thomas (born 1947), American peace activist
- Ellen Thomas (actress) (born 1964), Sierra Leonean-British actress
- Ellen Thomas (scientist), Dutch-born environmental scientist
- Ellen Thompson (disambiguation)
- Ellen Powell Tiberino (1937–1992), African-American visual artist
- Ellen Tiedtke (1930–2022), German actress
- Ellen Tittel (1948–2023), German middle-distance runner
- Ellen Joy Todd (1860–1948), Australian journalist, feminist and editor
- Ellen Tomek (born 1984), American rower
- Ellen Travolta (born 1940), American actress
- Ellen Trevorrow (born 1955), Aboriginal Australian weaver and cultural educator
- Ellen Tronnier (1927–2015), American baseball player
- Ellen Trotzig (1878–1949), Swedish artist
- Ellen Troxclair, American politician
- Ellen Trueblood (1911–1994), American mycologist
- Ellen Tuckey (1884–1939), one of the first three women
- Ellen Smith Tupper (1822–1888), American writer, expert beekeeper and first female editor

== U ==
- Ellen Ueberschär, German evangelical theologian
- Ellen Ugland (1953–2010), Norwegian billionaire
- Ellen Ullman (born 1949), American writer and programmer
- Ellen Umansky, American academic
- Ellen von Unwerth (born 1954), German photographer and director
- Ellen Urbani (born 1969), American author
- Ellen Uuspõld (1927–2019), Estonian linguist

== V ==
- Ellen Van Loy (born 1980), Belgian cyclo-cross cyclist
- Ellen Van Volkenburg (1882–1978), American actress
- Ellen Marie Vars (born 1957), Norwegian Sami writer
- Ellen Venker (born 1983), Dutch softball player
- Ellen Vilbaste (1893–1974), Estonian botanist
- Ellen Vitetta, American immunologist
- Ellen Vogel (1922–2015), Dutch actress
- Ellen Bryant Voigt (born 1943), American poet
- Ellen Voorhees, American computer scientist

== W ==
- Ellen Walshe (born 2001), Irish swimmer
- Ellen Walther (born 1999), Swiss Paralympic snowboarder
- Ellen Hardin Walworth (1832–1915), American lawyer
- Ellen Andrea Wang (born 1986), Norwegian jazz musician
- Ellen Wangerheim (born 2004), Swedish association footballer
- Ellen Wartella (born 1949), American child development
- Ellen Lima Wassu, Brazilian indigenous writer
- Ellen Doré Watson, American poet, translator and teacher
- Ellen Watson (1860–1889), American rancher
- Ellen Watson (cricketer) (born 2000), Scottish cricketer
- Ellen Watters (1988–2016), Canadian cyclist
- Ellen Weaver (born 1979), American politician
- Ellen Armstrong Weaver (1844–1924), American clubwoman
- Ellen Webber (1926–2003), Canadian politician and lawyer
- Ellen Webster (1881–1965), Australian politician
- Ellen Weeton (1776–1850), English school mistress, woman letter writer and governess
- Ellen van der Weijden-Bast (born 1971), Dutch water polo player
- Ellen Weinberg-Hughes (born 1969), American ice hockey player
- Ellen Weintraub, member of the United States Federal Election Commission
- Ellen Havre Weis (1957–2021), American historian and museum co-founder
- Ellen Weiss (born 1959), American journalist
- Ellen Weston (born 1939), American actress, producer and writer
- Ellen Wheeler (born 1961), American actress, director and producer
- Ellen Whinnett (born 1971), Australian journalist
- Ellen Whitaker (born 1986), English snow jumping rider
- Ellen White (disambiguation)
- E. Florence Whitlock (1889–1978), British composer, conductor and educator
- Ellen Whitmore (1828–1861), American educator and missionary
- Ellen Wibe (born 1965), Norwegian politician
- Ellen Widder (born 1955), German historian
- Ellen Wiegers (born 1980), Dutch speed skater
- Ellen Wiener (born 1954), American painter
- Ellen Wilkinson (1891–1947), British politician
- Ellen Williams (disambiguation)
- Ellen Willis (1941–2006), American writer
- Ellen Willmott (1858–1934), English horticulturalist
- Ellen Wilson (disambiguation)
- Ellen Winner (born 1947), psychologist
- Ellen Black Winston (1903–1984), American sociologist and social worker
- Ellen Winther (1933–2011), Danish opera singer
- Ellen Wittlinger (1948–2022), American author
- Ellen Woglom (born 1987), American actress
- Ellen E. Wohl, American aquatic scientist
- Ellen van Wolde (born 1954), Dutch biblical scholar
- Ellen Wondra, American theologian
- Ellen Wong (born 1985), Canadian actress
- Ellen Wood (disambiguation)
- Ellen Woodbury (born 1962), American sculptor
- Ellen Woodlock (1811–1884), Irish philanthropist
- Ellen Sullivan Woodward (1887–1971), American politician
- Ellen Riley Wright (1859–1904), English composer

== Y ==
- Ellen Beach Yaw (1869–1947), American opera singer
- Ellen Yoffa, American physicist and technical executive
- Ellen Young (disambiguation)

== Z ==
- Ellen Zavian (born 1963), American sports agent
- Ellen W. Zegura, American computer scientist
- Ellen Zentner, American economist
- Ellen Gould Zweibel (born 1952), American astrophysicist
- Ellen Taaffe Zwilich (born 1939), American classical music composer

== Fictional characters ==
- Ellen Ripley, the protagonist in the Alien film series
- Ellen Tebbits, the titular character in Beverly Cleary's 1951 novel
- Ellen Wilson (character), in the American science fiction web television series For All Mankind

== See also ==
- Aileen, a given name
- Elena (disambiguation)
- Elen (disambiguation)
- Ellen (disambiguation)
- Elín (disambiguation)
- Ellon (disambiguation)
- Helena (disambiguation)
- Helen (disambiguation)
- Helene (disambiguation)
