= Mark Mersiowsky =

German historian and diplomatist

Mark Mersiowsky (28 July 1963 in Herford) is a German historian and diplomatist. He is professor of History of the Middle Ages at the University of Stuttgart.

== Life ==
Mark Mersiowsky attended primary school in Kabul from 1969 to 1973 and Ravensberger Gymnasium Herford from 1973 to 1982. In 1982 he began his studies of Middle and Modern History, Historical Auxiliary Sciences and Art History at the Westfälische Wilhelms-Universität Münster, the Universität Wien and the Philipps-Universität Marburg, which he completed in 1988 with the Magister Artium at the WWU Münster. From 1988 he worked as a research assistant at the University of Münster. In 1992, he received his doctorate from Peter Johanek in Münster with a thesis on territorial accounting in the German Northwest. From 1998 to 2001 he had a scholarship of the Deutschen Forschungsgemeinschaft.

Since 1989 he has held lectureships in Medieval History and Historical Auxiliary Sciences at the Westfälische Wilhelms-Universität Münster, the University of Paderborn and the University of Tübingen and habilitated in 2002 at the Westfälische Wilhelms-Universität Münster, where he worked as a private lecturer in 2003/2004. In 2004, he was re-habilitated at the University of Stuttgart. His teaching authority (Venia legendi) included medieval history, comparative regional history and historical auxiliary sciences. Also in 2003 he was a visiting professor at the École nationale des chartes in Paris and in 2006/07 he held deputy professorships at the Universität Stuttgart and the Karl-Franzens-Universität Graz. In 2007, he was appointed associate professor at the University of Stuttgart. From 2003 to 2010 he was a research associate at the Monumenta Germaniae Historica and was responsible for diplomatics. Since February 1, 2010 he was the successor of Josef Riedmann. Professor of Medieval History and Historical Auxiliary Sciences at the University of Innsbruck. Since August 2010 he is a member of the Commission Internationale de Diplomatique. After a call to the University of Stuttgart for the W3 professorship for Medieval History as successor Folker Reichert he held a vacancy in the summer semester 2014, from November 1, 2014 he is professor there.

His research focuses on medieval history with a focus on the Carolingian time, the Staufer time, edition of the diplomas of King Henry (VII.) for the MGH diplomas and the Late Middle Ages, history of nobility, comparative city history, comparative regional history with emphasis on Westphalia, Rhineland, southwestern Germany, Tyrol, historical auxiliary sciences, especially diplomacy and palaeography, medieval business documents, invoices, but also the history of research of diplomacy and palaeography.

== Works ==
Monographies

- Die Anfänge territorialer Rechnungslegung im deutschen Nordwesten. Spätmittelalterliche Rechnungen, Verwaltungspraxis, Hof und Territorium. Stuttgart 2000 (Residenzenforschung 9), ISBN 3-7995-4509-3.
- Die Urkunde in der Karolingerzeit. Originale, Urkundenpraxis und politische Kommunikation, 2 vols., Wiesbaden 2015 (Monumenta Germaniae Historica Schriften 60), ISBN 978-3-447-10079-3.
- Together with Ellen Widder and Holger von Neuhoff: Von Christi Geburt bis in die Gegenwart: Die Geschichte des Christentums. Zwei Jahrtausende christlicher Geschichte – Zahlen, Fakten, Zusammenhänge und 40 Darstellungen aus der jeweiligen Epoche. Bonn 2003 (monumente).
- Together with Ellen Widder and Holger von Neuhoff: Von Christi Geburt bis in die Gegenwart: Die Geschichte des Christentums. Zwei Jahrtausende christlicher Geschichte – Zahlen, Fakten, Zusammenhänge und 40 Darstellungen aus der jeweiligen Epoche. 3., ed. Bonn 2007 (monumente)
- Chartae Latinae Antiquiores. Facsimile-edition of the Latin Charters, 2nd series, ninth century, ed. by Guglielmo Cavallo, Giovanna Nicolaj. Part CXV: Germany IV, publ. by Mark Mersiowsky. Dietikon–Zürich 2019

Editorships

- Together with Ellen Widder, Maria-Theresia Leuker: Manipulus florum. Aus Mittelalter, Landesgeschichte, Literatur und Historiographie. Festschrift für Peter Johanek zum 60. Geburtstag, Münster 2000, ISBN 3-89325-743-8.
- Together with Ellen Widder, Peter Johanek: Vestigia monasteriensia: Westfalen - Rheinland - Niederlande, Bielefeld 1995, ISBN 3-89534-110-X.
- Together with Christoph Haidacher: 1363 – 2013 650 Jahre Tirol mit Österreich Dem Andenken an Ao. Univ.-Prof. Dr. Klaus Brandstätter † 23.8.2014 gewidmet (Veröffentlichungen des Tiroler Landesarchivs Band 20), Innsbruck 2015; ISBN 978-3-7030-0851-1.
- Together with Peter Rückert, Nicole Bickhoff: Briefe aus dem Spätmittelalter: Herrschaftliche Korrespondenz im deutschen Südwesten, Stuttgart 2015; ISBN 978-3-17-026340-6.
