= Wondra =

Wondra may refer to:

- A brand of Gold Medal Flour
- Jubilee (character), a Marvel Comics character also known as Wondra
- Ellen Wondra, American theologian
