= Ellen Peterson =

American activist

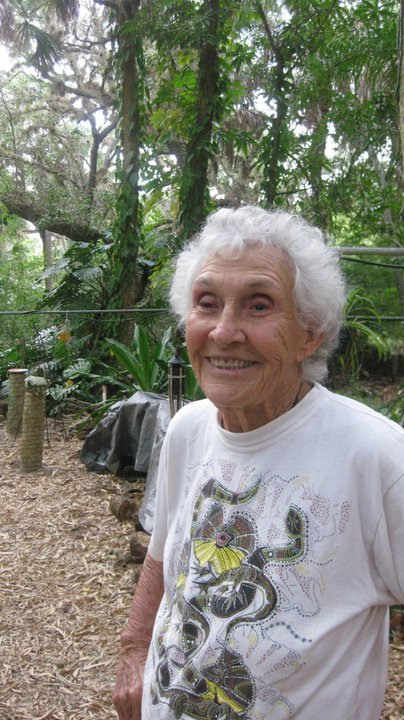
- Ellen Peterson in Estero, Florida, 2010
- Born: Charlotte, North Carolina
- Died: Estero, Florida
- Education: University of Georgia

Ellen Peterson (December 5, 1923 – October 14, 2011) was an American activist.

== Early life and education ==
Peterson was born Yancey Ellen Salisbury in Charlotte, North Carolina on December 5, 1923 to Sehlby Walker Salibsury and Yancey Long. She was a 1945 graduate of the University of Georgia and earned a master's degree in counseling from Appalachian State University in 1966.

== Career ==
Peterson founded five different non-profit environmental organizations in her lifetime and was a fierce protector of Florida's waterways and the Everglades. Peterson was a well-known environmental, and peace and justice activist who protested against nuclear power plants and coal fired plants in the Everglades and wetlands of South Florida.

She founded Save Our Creeks in Palmdale, Florida to save FishEating Creek in Glades County, Florida.

In 2006, she founded the Happehatchee Center, a nonprofit eco-spiritual center for the Lee County community that held New Age spirituality classes, in Estero, Florida. Upon her death October 14, 2011 her estate established a trust with a board of directors charged with making the property open to the public. Six months later the center was closed for two months while the programs were restructured. The Happehatchee Center building acquired from the Buckingham Airfield in 1947 was declared an Individual Historic Resource by the Lee County Historic Preservation Program on November 28, 2012.

== Personal life and death ==
Peterson was married multiple times. She died at the age of 87 at her home in Estero, Florida on October 14, 2011.
