= Ellen Stewart (disambiguation) =

Ellen Stewart (1919–2011) was an American theatre director and producer.

Ellen Stewart may also refer to:

- Dame Adrienne Stewart, full name Ellen Adrienne Stewart (born 1936), major patron of the arts in Christchurch, New Zealand
- Ellen S. Stewart (1919–2009), American physicist
- Ellen Lowell, formerly Ellen Stewart, a fictional character in the soap opera As the World Turns
