= Ellen Martin =

Ellen Martin may refer to:

- Ellen A. Martin, American attorney
- Ellen E. Martin, American paleoceanographer
