= Ellen White =

Ellen White may refer to:

- Ellen White (footballer) (born 1989), English international footballer (soccer player)
- Ellen White (Snuneymuxw First Nation) (1922–2018), Canadian Snuneymuxw First Nation elder and author
- Ellen Emerson White, American author
- Ellen G. White (1827–1915), American author and co-founder of the Seventh-day Adventist Church
