= Ellen E. Martin =

Ellen Eckels Martin (born 1959) is an American paleoceanographer who is an expert on geochemical proxies. She is a professor of geology and chair of geological sciences at the University of Florida College of Liberal Arts and Sciences. She was elected a fellow of the American Geophysical Union in 2023. She earned a B.A. in earth science from Wesleyan University in 1981. Martin received a M.S. in geology from Duke University in 1987. She completed a Ph.D. in oceanography from Scripps Institution of Oceanography and University of California, San Diego in 1993. Her dissertation was titled, Seawater Radiogenic Isotopes as a Record of Continental Weathering Patterns. J. Douglas MacDougall was her doctoral advisor.

== Selected publications ==
- Segun B. Adebayo, Minming Cui, Thomas J. Williams, Ellen Martin, Karen H. Johannesson, Evolution of rare earth element and εNd compositions of Gulf of Mexico seawater during interaction with Mississippi River sediment, Geochimica et Cosmochimica Acta, Volume 335, 2022, Pages 231-242, ISSN 0016-7037, https://doi.org/10.1016/j.gca.2022.08.024.
- Thomas John Williams, Ellen E. Martin, Elisabeth Sikes, Aidan Starr, Natalie E. Umling, Ryan Glaubke, Neodymium isotope evidence for coupled Southern Ocean circulation and Antarctic climate throughout the last 118,000 years, Quaternary Science Reviews, Volume 260, 2021, 106915, ISSN 0277-3791, https://doi.org/10.1016/j.quascirev.2021.106915.
