= Ellen Manderfield =

American designer (1916–1999)

- Born: February 11, 1916; Chicago, Illinois
- Died: March 21, 1999 (aged 83)
- Education: Loyola University Chicago
- Occupation: Product designer
- Known for: First woman to receive the IDSA Personal Recognition Award

Ellen B. Manderfield (February 11, 1916 – March 21, 1999) was an American industrial designer. She was the first female member of the American Society of Industrial Designers, which later merged with two other organizations to form the Industrial Designers Society of America (IDSA). She was also the first woman to receive the IDSA Personal Recognition Award in 1992.

== Early life ==
Manderfield was born in Chicago. Her father introduced her to woodworking, but told her that furniture design was an unsuitable profession for a woman. She went into commercial graphic art instead, graduating from Loyola University Chicago, followed by advanced study at a commercial art school, which she completed in 1939.

== Career ==
During the early years of her career, Manderfield worked on packaging and graphics. Her first proper industrial design job was at Colonial Radio Corporation, where she worked on designs for televisions, radio receivers, and record players. She eventually supervised a staff of seven, working in particular on prototypes of portable receivers. In 1947, she was hired by Montgomery Ward, where she worked under Anne Swainson, along with a number of other noted women designers. Until 1951, she designed various appliances for the company, ranging from sewing machines to lawn mowers and accordions. The range of styles in her early years covered most of the gamut in use in the United States at the time, from Scandinavian modern to early American-inspired style.

She worked at General Electric, at Syracuse, New York, from 1951 to 1956. While her husband was based in Chicago at the time, she did not join him there but commuted regularly to Chicago. During her time in Syracuse, she was among the founders of the local branch of the Industrial Design Institute. From 1956 to her retirement in 1986, she worked at Oneida Silversmiths, designing metal flatware and plastic dishware. Manderfield was active in professional organisations, becoming the first female member of the American Society of Industrial Designers (ASID) in 1957. In 1965, the ASID merged with the Industrial Designers Institute (IDI) and the Industrial Design Educators Association to create the Industrial Designers Society of America (IDSA).

In 1992, Manderfield became the first woman to receive the IDSA Personal Recognition Award during her retirement.

== Exhibitions ==
Several museums hold her designs, including the Museum of Modern Art, which obtained her Oneida "Omni" design of stainless steel flatware in 1979, while she was still active.
