= Ellen Frank =

Ellen Frank may refer to:

- Ellen Frank (artist), American artist, writer, and educator
- Ellen Frank (actress) (1904–1999), German film and television actress
- Ellen Frank (scientist), American psychologist
