= Ellen Eriksen =

Norwegian politician (born 1972)

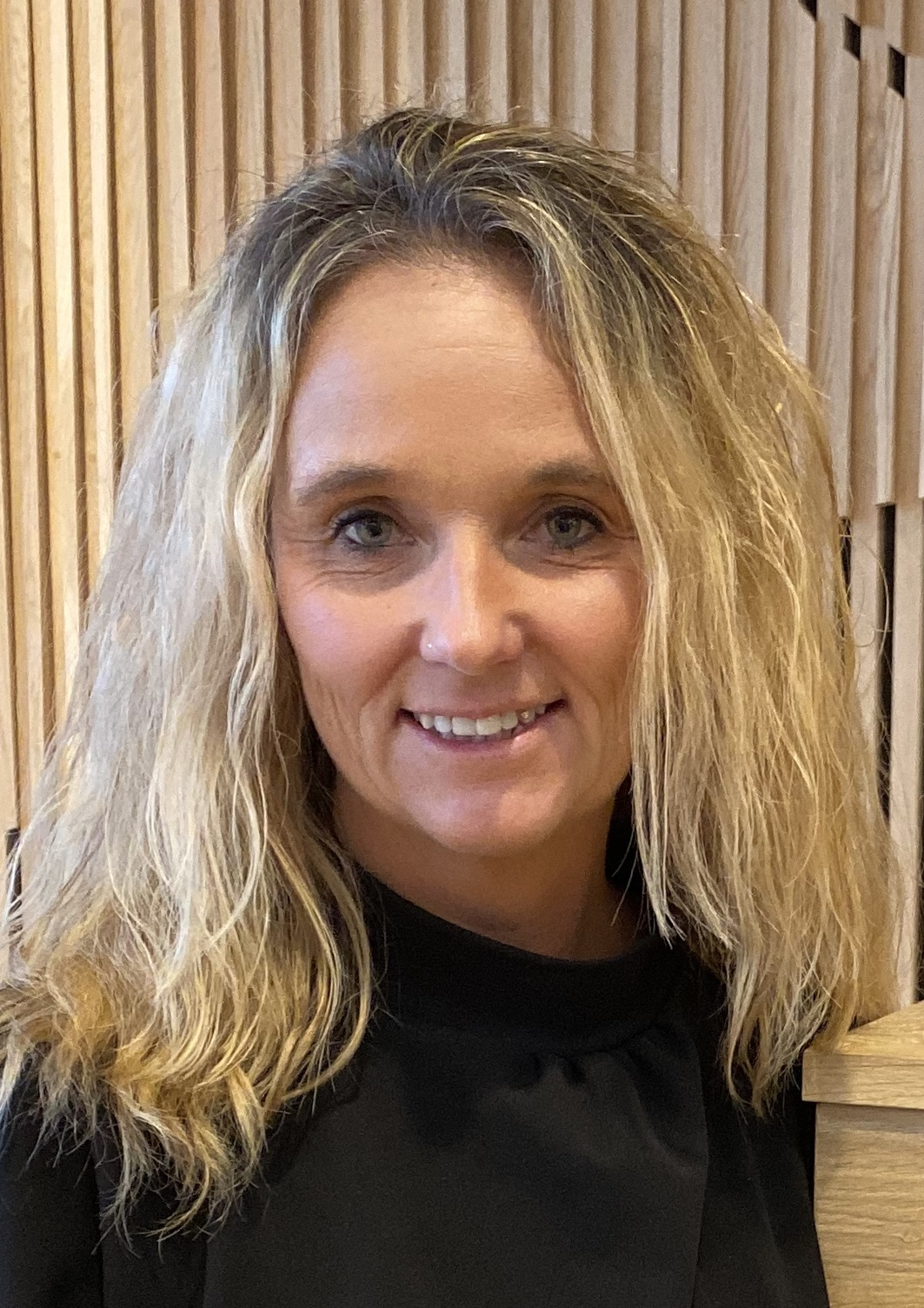
Ellen Eriksen (2019)

Ellen Eriksen (born 30 July 1972) is a Norwegian politician for the Progress Party.

She served as a deputy representative to the Parliament of Norway from Vestfold during the terms 2009–2013 and 2013–2017. She resides in Svarstad.
