= Ellen van Eldik =

Dutch footballer

Personal information
- Full name: E. C. C. van Eldik
- Date of birth: 14 June 1960 (age 66)
- Position: Forward

Senior career*
Years	Team	Apps	(Gls)
1976–1980	SC N.E.C.		
1981–1990	GVC		
1991–1996	DVC Den Dungen		

International career
1980	Netherlands	2	(2)
- * Club domestic league appearances and goals

Ellen van Eldik (born 14 June 1960) is a Dutch former football player and manager for GVC. Eldik is considered a pioneer in the history of women's football in the Netherlands.

== Career ==
Van Eldik played for SC N.E.C., GVC and DVC Den Dungen. With DVC she won multiple national championships. In 1980 she played two matches for the Netherlands women's national football team, scoring two goals. She coached women's teams at various amateur clubs around Nijmegen and worked as a financial employee at N.E.C. and FC Twente.

Eldik became a coach for NEC Nijmegen.

For her services to women's football, Van Eldik received the Zilveren Waalbrugspeld from the municipality of Nijmegen in 2017.
