= Ellen Beer =

Swiss art historian

Ellen Judith Beer (12 March 1926 – 18 March 2004) was a Swiss art historian. She focused on Medieval art.

== Biography ==
Beer received her doctorate degree at the University of Zurich with her publication about the "Rose der Kathedrale von Lausanne", the rose window in the Lausanne Cathedral.

In 1965, she became associate professor and 1971 full professor at the University of Bern. The Ellen-J.-Beer Foundation was created in her memory; it supports young researchers and medieval art history projects.

== Career ==
With her publications about the mysticism of light (1972) and gold-ground painting techniques (1982), she has published internationally received and still relevant reference books. She later published two volumes about Swiss stained glass from the 12th to the 15th century as well as books about illuminated manuscripts in Carolingian, Ottonian, and Gothic Gothic art. While her books focused mainly on style and iconography, her articles explored new methodologies: She addressed the function of objects, theological backgrounds, questions of motif and historical-political programs.

== Publications (selection) ==
- Beer, Ellen J., Die Rose der Kathedrale von Lausanne und der kosmologische Bilderkreis des Mittelalters Bern : Benteli, 1952
- Beer, Ellen J., Die Glasmalereien der Schweiz vom 12. bis zum Beginn des 14. Jahrhunderts. - Basel, 1956
- Beer, Ellen J., Beiträge zur oberrheinischen Buchmalerei in der ersten Hälfte des 14. Jahrhunderts unter besonderer Berücksichtigung der Initialornamentik, Basel [u.a.] : Birkhäuser, 1959
- Beer, Ellen J. (Hg.), Festschrift Hans R. Hahnloser : zum 60. Geburtstag 1959, Basel [u.a.] : Birkhäuser, 1961
- Beer, Ellen J., Initial und Miniatur: Buchmalerei aus 9 Jahrhunderten in Handschriften der Badischen Landesbibliothek; [Jubiläumsausstellung 1965], Basel : Feuermann, 1965
- Beer, Ellen J., Die Glasmalereien der Schweiz aus dem 14. und 15. Jahrhundert : ohne Königsfelden und Berner Münsterchor. Basel : Birkhäuser, 1965 (Corpus vitrearum medii aevi / Schweiz; 3)
- Beer, Ellen J., Die Bibel von Moutier-Grandval : British Museum Add. Ms. 10546, Bern : Verein Schweizer. Lithographiebesitzer, 1971.
- Beer, Ellen J., Mystik des Lichts in der Kunst des Abendlandes, Bern [u.a.] : Lang, 1972.
- Beer, Ellen J. [Hg.], Berns grosse Zeit : das 15. Jahrhundert neu entdeckt. Bern : Berner Lehrmittel- und Medienverlag, 1999

== Literature ==
- Beer, Ellen J. [Gefeierte] Nobile claret opus : Festgabe für Ellen Judith Beer. Zürich : Schwegler, 1986 (Zeitschrift für schweizerische Archäologie und Kunstgeschichte; 43.1986, 1)
- Becksmann, Rüdiger: Ellen Judith Beer (12. März 1926 - 18. März 2004), in: Zeitschrift des Deutschen Vereins für Kunstwissenschaft, 59/60.2005/06(2007), 319-321.
- Kurmann-Schwarz, Brigitte: Nachruf auf Ellen Judith Beer (12. März 1926 - 18. März 2004), in: Zeitschrift für Kunstgeschichte, 68.2005, 589-592.
