= Ellen Lumpkin =

American neuroscientist

Ellen Lumpkin is an American neuroscientist and professor of cell and developmental biology and neurobiology at the Helen Wills Neuroscience Institute at the University of California, Berkeley. She is also co-director of the MBL Advanced Training Course in Neurobiology, and adjunct associate professor of physiology and cellular biophysics and co-director of the Thompson Family Foundation Initiative in CIPN and Sensory Neuroscience at Columbia University. Lumpkin's group studies genes, cells and signals that mediate the sensation of touch. Lumpkin is most interested in the somatosensory system and how it gives feedback to the brain on sensations such as pain or touch. She is known for her significant contributions in somatosensory system research.

== Early life and education ==
Lumpkin was born in rural East Texas in an agriculturally-based town, where she spent her childhood years driving tractors and raising cows and pigs. In high school, she joined Future Farmers of America, which fully funded her college education given that she majored in agriculture and went to a local state university. Lumpkin earned a B.S. in Animal Science at Texas Tech University in Lubbock, Texas. During her undergraduate years, Lumpkin studied the effects of stress on the health of animals, more specifically, how certain social or shipping conditions can lead to weight loss of pigs by the stress hormone cortisol. Lumpkin performed PhD training in neuroscience with A. James Hudspeth at University of Texas Southwestern and the Rockefeller University.

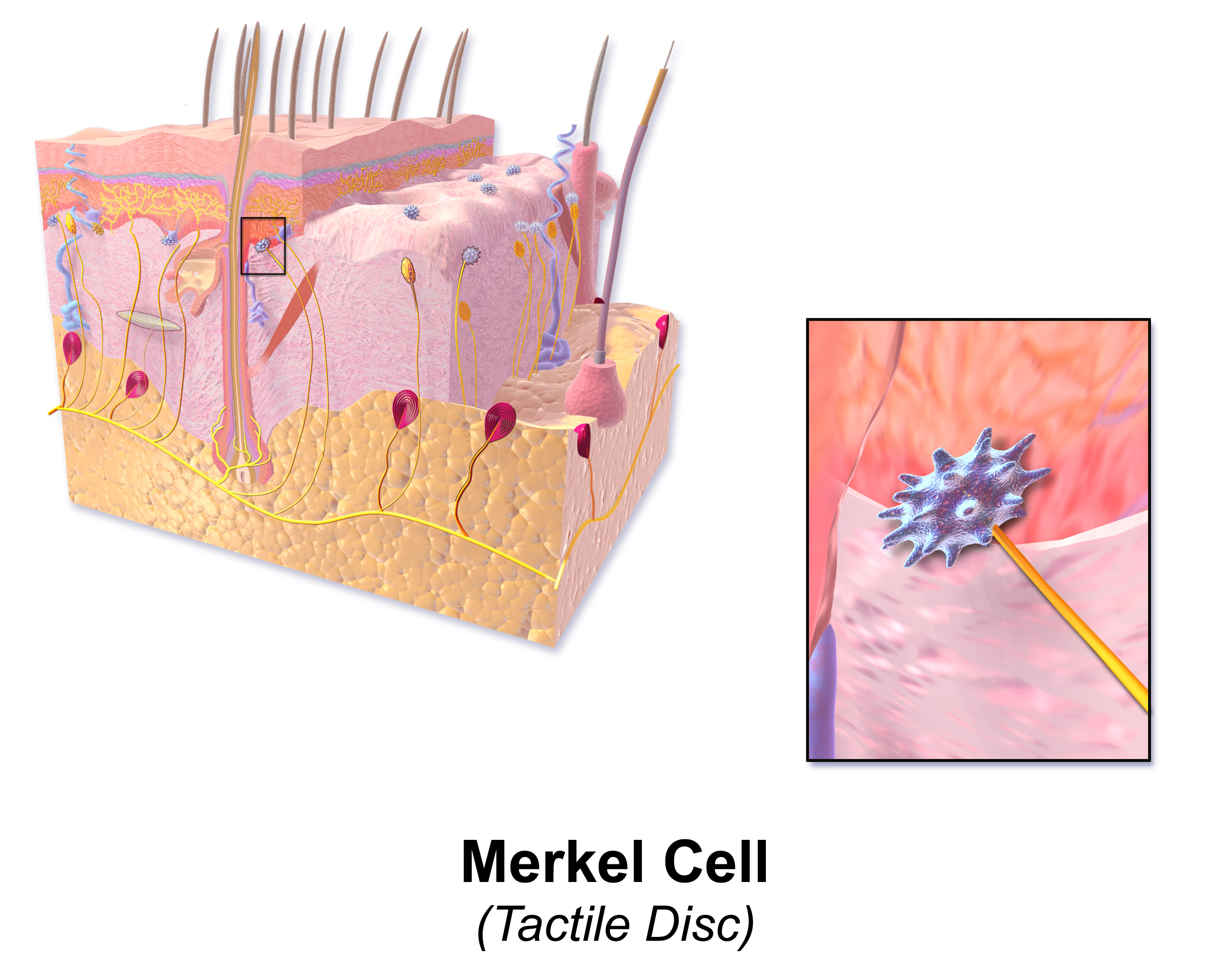
Merkel Cell

== Career and research ==
Lumpkin worked at Columbia University as an associate professor and researcher for 11 years. She now does research at the University of California, Berkeley in the Molecular and Cell Biology department studying the somatosensory system. Lumpkin's lab studies the somatosensory pathways that encode various stimuli like touch, vibration, and texture. Her research is on the skin's sensory neurons pick up tactile features of objects and how skin cells communicate with the neuro system to encode touch.

Merkel cells are found in clusters called touch domes, which are then connected to neuronal networks. Lumpkin studies how these cells respond to the sensation of touch by sensing shape, form, and texture. Ellen Lumpkin and her team discovered the specialization of Merkel cells involved in encoding different aspects of the sensation of touch. Her team discovered that Merkel cells have fast, mechanically activated ion channels, they are capable of sending information to activate sensory neurons, and the activity of Merkel cells is required during touch stimulation. These findings allowed her lab to conclude that Merkel cells are mechanosensory receptor cells, and she published a paper explaining these results in 2019. Her research has also disproved the common belief that Merkel cells are descended from the neural crest, instead showing that they originate in the skin

== Awards ==
On January 15, 1999, she received the Runyon-Winchell Fellowship Award. She won the Schaefer Scholars Award in 2015. She currently serves as the Co-Director of the Thompson Family Foundation Initiative in CIPN & Sensory Neuroscience.
