= Ellen Wilson =

Ellen Wilson may refer to:

- Ellen Axson Wilson (1860–1914), American First Lady
- Ellen Wilson (judoka) (born 1976), American judoka
- Ellen Wilson (character), a character from the American science fiction web television series For All Mankind
