= Ellen Sewall Osgood =

American amateur geologist

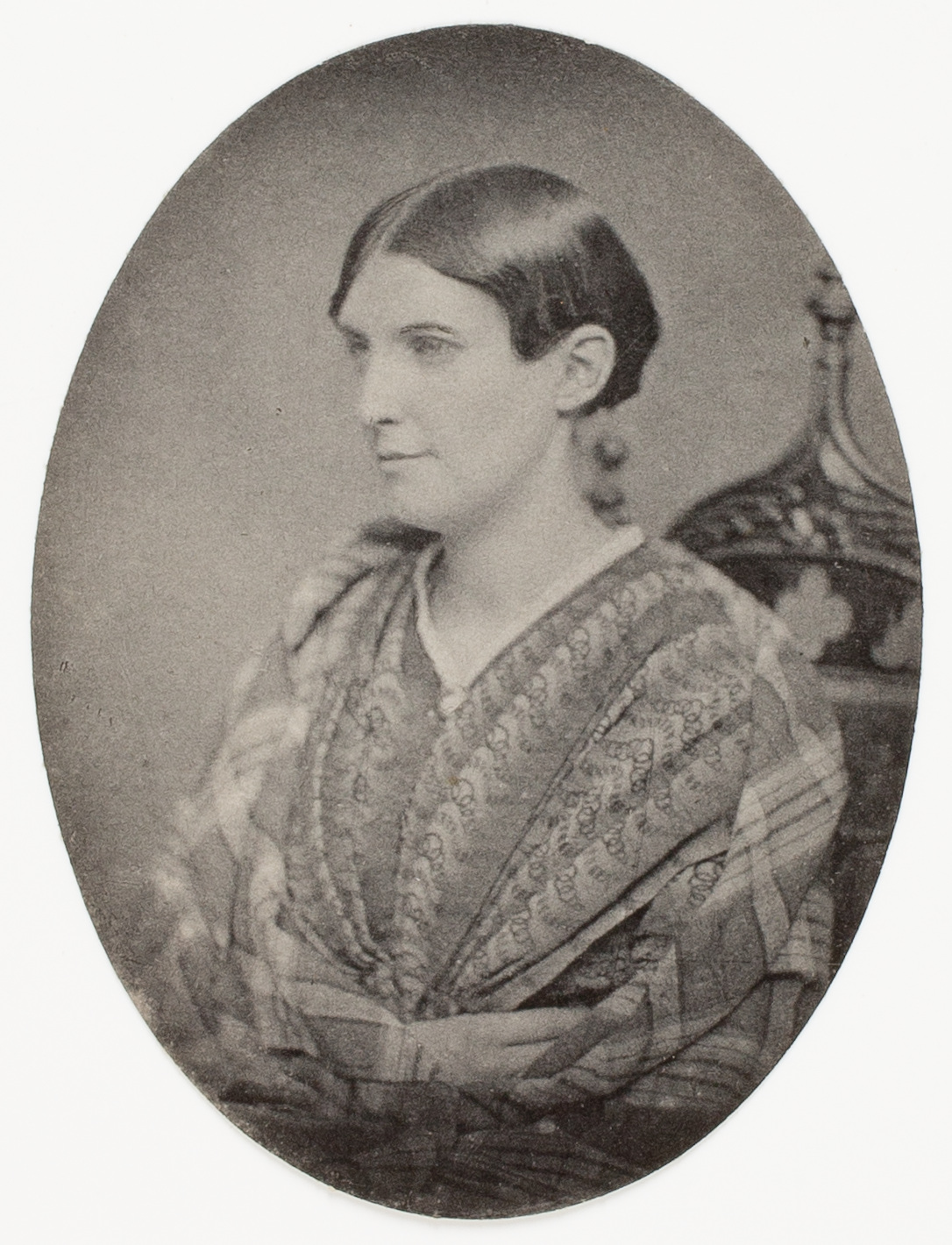
- Born: March 10, 1822; Barnstable
- Died: December 8, 1892
- Occupation: Geologist
- Father: Edmund Quincy Sewall

Ellen Devereux Sewall Osgood (March 10, 1822 – December 8, 1892) was an American amateur geologist also known for being a love interest of Henry David Thoreau.

== Biography ==
=== Early life and education ===
Ellen Devereux Sewall was born on March 10, 1822 in Barnstable, Massachusetts, the daughter of the Rev. Edmund Quincy Sewall, a Unitarian minister, and Caroline Ward Sewall. She was named after the heroine of Walter Scott's poem "Lochinvar". She was educated at the Roxbury Female Academy.

=== Natural history ===
Her education sparked her lifelong interest in natural history, particularly geology. She created a herbarium and collected geological specimens in a handmade mahogany box given to her by Henry David Thoreau, now in the Concord Museum.

=== Courtship and marriage ===
Beginning in 1839, she was courted by both Henry David Thoreau and his younger brother John Thoreau. Both men sent her letters and gifts, including mineral specimens. The next year both John and then Henry proposed to her. She initially accepted John's proposal, but later rejected it, and rejected Henry's proposal at the insistence of her father. Henry David Thoreau's poem "Sympathy" was written about Osgood's younger brother, George. In 1962, at the age of 98, her youngest daughter, artist Louise Osgood Koopman, published an account of her mother's relationship with Thoreau in the Massachusetts Review.

In 1844, she married the Rev. Joseph Osgood, a Unitarian minister like her father. They had ten children.

=== Death ===
Ellen Sewall Osgood died in December 1892.
