= Ellen Gruenbaum =

American anthropologist

- Born: Burlington, California

Academic background
- Education: University of Connecticut

Academic work
- Main interests: Gender studies and history
- Notable works: The Female Circumcision Controversy

Ellen Gruenbaum is an American anthropologist. A specialist in researching medical practices that are based on a society's culture.

== Personal life ==
Gruenbaum was born in St. Louis, Missouri, US, and received her A.B. in anthropology at Stanford University in 1974. She went on to the University of Connecticut to earn her M.A. in 1974 and her Ph.D. in 1982 in anthropology. Her doctoral thesis was "Health services, health, and development in Sudan : the impact of the Gezira irrigated scheme".

== Career ==
Gruenbaum was a professor and chair of the Anthropology Department at Purdue University. She has served as a professor in the department of anthropology, director of the Women's Studies Program and dean of the College of Social Sciences at California State University, Fresno. She has worked at California State University, San Bernardino, University of Wisconsin in Manitowoc, and the University of Khartoum, Sudan. Since August 2008 she has been department head of anthropology at Purdue. She teaches cultural anthropology coursed that cover religion, gender, health, and post-colonial situations in Africa and the Middle East. As a medical anthropologist she was the secretary for the Society for Medical Anthropology. She is on the editorial advisory board for the Journal of Middle East Women's Studies.

Her specialization is medical anthropology with a focus on culturally oriented issues, particularly in Africa and the Middle East. Much of her research occurred in Sudan between 1974 and 1979, 1998, 1992, and 2004. She also conducted research in Sierra Leone between 2007 and 2008. Gruenbaum's research focuses on practices relating to female genital cutting (circumcision), women's health in rural African and Middle Eastern contexts, and child protection and human rights movements.

She has written several works, including The Female Circumcision Controversy: An Anthropological Perspective, A Study of Social Services in Gezira Province, A Movement Against Clitoridectomy and Infibulation in Sudan, Nuer Women in Southern Sudan, and Development Schemes, Cultural Debates, and Rural Women's Health in Sudan.

She served as the secretary of the Society for Medical Anthropology from 2006 until 2009 and is on the editorial advisory board of the Journal of Middle East Women's Studies. She is a member of the American Anthropological Association and has memberships in the Association for Africanist Anthropology, Association for Feminist Anthropology, Middle East Section, and Society for Medical Anthropology.

She has worked with another Purdue professor, Sophie A Lelièvre, in Ghana to research cultural aspects of policy decisions related to breast health in many countries, including Ghana, Lebanon, France, Japan, and Uruguay. Gruenbaum considers her greatest achievement in her career to be working with UNICEF in 2004, when she was able to conduct research and advocate social marketing for the involvement of girls in female genital cutting and circumcision. She also worked as a research consultant for CARE studying traditional health practices.

== Selected bibliography ==
=== Books ===
Gruenbaum is best known for her book The Female Circumcision Controversy. This book presents an account of the female circumcision controversy in parts of Africa and the Middle East.

=== Journal articles ===
Gruenbaum has also written a number of articles that reflect her work in Sudan, including:

- Gruenbaum, Ellen (September 1995). "Book review: "Women's Medicine: The Zar-Bori Cult in Africa and Beyond", I. M. Lewis, Ahmed Al-Safi, and Sayyid Hurreiz, eds". Medical Anthropology Quarterly. 9 (3): 418–420. doi:10.1525/maq.1995.9.3.02a00100. JSTOR 649350.
- Gruenbaum, Ellen (Spring 2005). "Feminist activism for the abolition of FGC in Sudan". Journal of Middle East Women's Studies. 1 (2): 89–111. doi:10.1215/15525864-2005-2004. JSTOR 40326858. S2CID 145726543.
- Gruenbaum, Ellen (September 2005). "Socio-cultural dynamics of female genital cutting: research findings, gaps, and directions". Culture, Health & Sexuality. 7 (5): 429–441. doi:10.1080/13691050500262953. JSTOR 4005473. PMID 16864214. S2CID 4999356.
- Gruenbaum, Ellen (March 2006). "Sexuality issues in the movement to abolish female genital cutting in Sudan". Medical Anthropology Quarterly. 20 (1): 121–138. doi:10.1525/maq.2006.20.1.121. PMID 16612996.

=== Working papers ===
- Gruenbaum, Ellen (1990). Nuer women in Southern Sudan: health, reproduction and work (pdf). National Bureau of Economic Research (NBER). WP215.
