= Ellen Peters =

Ellen Peters may refer to:

- Ellen Ash Peters (1930–2024), Connecticut Supreme Court justice
- Ellen Dolly Peters (1894–1995), Montserratian trade unionist and educator
- Ellen Peters (professor), decision psychologist
