= Ellen Barry =

Ellen Barry may refer to:

- Ellen Barry (tennis) (born 1989), New Zealand tennis player
- Ellen Barry (journalist) (born 1971), American journalist for The New York Times
- Ellen Barry (attorney) (born 1953), American attorney and public interest lawyer
- Ellen Semple Barry (1899–1995), American portrait artist and wife of playwright Philip Barry
