= Ellen Wiener =

American painter

Ellen Claire Wiener (born October 18, 1954) is an American artist specializing in painting and printmaking. She holds degrees from Bennington College and Queens College, CUNY, and has taught at the university level since 1985. Her most recent work is Longhand Forest, a 17-foot pen-and-ink drawing produced as part of a collaborative exhibition with poet LB Thompson.

== Recognition ==
Wiener has received several honors including The Andrew Carnegie Prize for Painting from The National Academy of Design, The William Randolph Hearst Fellowship for Creative and Performing Artists and Writers from The American Antiquarian Society, residency grants from The MacDowell Colony, The Virginia Center for the Creative Arts, The Ragdale Foundation, Holy Cross Monastery and stipends from The New York Foundation for the Arts.
