= Ellen Kent =

British theatre director

- Born: 1949 or 1950 (age 76–77); India
- Occupations: Theatre Director and Producer
- Years active: 1985-present
- Known for: Opera
- Website: www.ellenkent.com

Ellen Kent (born 1949 or 1950) is a British theatre director and producer. She is known for her touring opera productions featuring artists from Eastern Europe.

== Early life ==
Kent was born in India in 1949 or 1950, the daughter of a British high commissioner and Parsee mother. She grew up in Bombay before moving to Cromer, Norfolk, for boarding school. Kent went on to study at Durham University and the Bristol Old Vic Theatre School.

== Career ==
Following a period as an actress, Kent founded the Dual Control Theatre Company in 1985. Success was limited until in 1993 she was commissioned by Rochester Council to produce a show for the annual Medway Arts Festival, with the brief of "something spectacular". In response, Kent flew over the Romanian State Opera for a single performance. The event was well received, and this became the first of many opera and ballet productions which Kent brought from Eastern Europe to perform in the UK.

Kent became particularly known in the UK as one of the pioneers behind travelling shows of musicians and performers from Eastern Europe, and while there was some negative criticism particularly about the exploitative nature of such tours, an article in The Observer indicated the performers were adequately compensated and the music itself "professional with some notably good singers". By 2001, touring performances from Moldova were seen as "essential" economic exports, and Kent and her company produced a UK tour of The Nutcracker with the Chisinau National Ballet.

Kent is known for featuring animals in her productions, including in 2025 for a production of La Bohème with the Ukrainian Opera and Ballet Theatre. In 2026 Kent produced and directed her "Farewell Opera Tour". Featuring productions of both Carmen and Madame Butterfly, the tour was promoted as Kent's last in the UK.

== Awards and recognition ==
Kent was awarded a medal by the president of Moldova for "Best Contribution to the Arts of Moldova", and an honorary medal by the Ukrainian president for her contributions to the National Opera of Ukraine.
