= Ellen Popeyus =

Former Dutch footballer

International career
Years	Team	Apps	(Gls)
1973-1984	Netherlands	22	(0)

Ellen Popeyus is a former Dutch footballer who represented the Netherlands women's national football team 22 times.

== International career ==
On November 9, 1973, Popeyus won the first of 22 caps the Dutch national team playing against England.
