= Ellen Clementine Howarth =

American poet

- Born: May 17, 1827; Cooperstown, New York
- Died: December 23, 1899 (aged 72); Trenton, New Jersey
- Occupation: Poet

Ellen Clementine Howarth (born Ellen Clementine Doran in Cooperstown, New York, May 17, 1827, died Trenton, New Jersey, December 23, 1899), was an American poet.

The daughter of a calico printer, and employed as a factory worker at the age of seven, she married Joseph Howarth, in the same occupation. She lived at Trenton, New Jersey in extremely reduced circumstances until friends secured her a comfortable subsistence. She authored a volume of poems in 1864, The Wind-Harp and Other Poems, and also wrote words for the song "'Tis but a Little Faded Flower" using the Frederick Enoch, Esq. pseudonymn. Her later work, Poems (1867), was edited by Richard Watson Gilder.

Howarth said her poems came to her as she did housework, and she only wrote them down when she considered them finished. They were initially published in newspapers in Trenton under the pen name "Clementine", and then in magazines; Richard Gilder helped her find markets for them. She wrote many poems in a few years, and then mostly ceased writing.
