= Ellen Mason =

Ellen Mason may refer to:

- Ellen Francis Mason (1846–1930), New England author, civic leader, translator, and philanthropist
- Ellen Huntly Bullard Mason (1817–1894), American Baptist foreign missionary and writer
