= Ellen McCourt =

British trade unionist

Ellen McCourt (born January 1984) is a British trade unionist, and was a representative for junior doctors at the British Medical Association (BMA) during a dispute about the 2016 contract of employment.

== Early life and education ==
She was born in Newcastle, and grew up in the west of Whitley Bay. Her parents, Kath (née Kaiser) and James McCourt, married in 1981. She has a younger brother.

Her mother, Professor Kath McCourt, is a former head of the governing council of the Royal College of Nursing (RCN). Kath McCourt retired in 2016 as the dean of the Faculty of Health and Life Sciences at the Northumbria University (former Newcastle Polytechnic before 1992), and was awarded the CBE in the 2012 Birthday Honours.

In 2006 Ellen McCourt gained a BSc in medical science from the University of St Andrews. In 2009 she gained an MBChB from the University of Manchester. She has recently completed an MSc in global health with global surgery at King's College London (KCL).

== Career ==
=== Medical posts ===
She did a foundation programme in the North West, and a core surgery programme in the North East. She completed a year as an orthopaedic registrar.

She works in the Yorkshire region as a trainee in emergency medicine.

=== British Medical Association ===
Ellen McCourt joined the BMA as a student in 2005, and became active within it in 2013. She became chair of the junior doctors' committee (JDC) of the BMA in July 2016, following a vote by junior doctors to reject a new contract of employment imposed by the health secretary Jeremy Hunt.

== See also ==
- List of health and medical strikes
- Medical education in the United Kingdom

Trade union offices
Preceded by Johann Malawana	Chairman of the BMA JDC; July 2016–	Succeeded by Incumbent
