= Ellen Corkrum =

Liberian/ Ghanaian politician and presidential candidate

- Citizenship: Ghana
- Education: Massachusetts Institute of Technologgy
- Occupation: politician

Ellen Corkrum is a Liberian/ Ghanaian philanthropist politician and presidential candidate, and convicted criminal, who previously served as an officer in the United States military and as a commercial pilot.

She served as the managing director of the Liberia Airports Authority, and was forced to flee the country after exposing alleged corruption in the government. She has announced her candidacy for President of Liberia in the 2017 election.

== Biography ==
Born in Liberia, Corkrum moved to Minnesota at age 13. Corkrum served as a U.S. military Black Hawk assault helicopter pilot, a major in the United States Armed Forces reserves, and a commercial airline pilot. She is a graduate of Harvard University, with a master's degree in public administration. Corkrum also holds an MBA from the Massachusetts Institute of Technology.

Corkrum returned Liberia to work as the managing director of the Liberia Airports Authority. After reporting the corruption she witnessed, her life was threatened and a campaign of public intimidation was launched. She escaped from Liberia, by road, through Sierra Leone, then Europe before making it back to the U.S. The current Liberian National Police Director, Chris Massaquoi, defied the President's orders and helped Corkrum escape, stating that he was part of a top-level meeting where her capture was revealed. Liberia's Minister of Defense, Brownie Samukai is also heard on tape, revealing to Corkrum that top government officials had set her up to cover their fraudulent practices. Corkrum secretly recorded these and other officials, including the executive office. Corkrum presented this evidence, including a 300-page binder of documentation to the U.S. State Department and the U.S. Justice Department.

== Name Change to Hunter VanPelt ==
In July 2016 'Ellen Corkrum' legally changed her name to 'Hunter VanPelt'.

She has also been known to use the names 'Ellen Yabba Kwame Corkrum' and 'Hunter Lauren VanPelt'.

== Pleads guilty to fraud in USA ==
On 18 August 2021- VanPelt (aka Corkrum) to committing a more than US$6 million fraud in USA, specifically involving defrauding of the USA's Paycheck Protection Program (PPP).

The case has been investigated by the Federal Bureau of Investigation (FBI) and the Federal Housing Finance Agency Office of Inspector General. The Assistant U.S. Attorney, Christopher J. Huber (Deputy Chief of the Complex Frauds Section), and Department of Justice Trial Attorney Chris A. Wenger prosecuted the case.

According to Acting U.S. Attorney Erskine, the charge and other information presented in court: VanPelt (aka Corkrum), using both her names, submitted six false and fraudulent PPP loans between 27 April 2020 and 17 June 2020. The amounts requested in the six loans totalled $7,943,591.50, of which $6,017,066.50 was disbursed.

== Sentencing ==
Sentencing for VanPelt (aka Corkrum) was scheduled for 4 January 2022, at 10:00 a.m., before U.S. District Judge Mark H. Cohen.
