= Ellen S. Stewart =

American physicist

- Born: Ellen Elizabeth Swomley; February 6, 1919; Pennsylvania, US
- Died: August 29, 2009 (aged 90)
- Other names: Ellen Swomley Stewart; Ellen Elizabeth Swomley Kuhns
- Education: Coe College; Johns Hopkins University (PhD)
- Scientific career
- Fields: Physics, sonar
- Workplaces: New Jersey College for Women; Connecticut College for Women; Naval Electronics Laboratory
- Thesis: Dispersion of the velocity and anomalous absorption of sound in hydrogen (1946)

Ellen Elizabeth Swomley Kuhns (February 6, 1919 – August 29, 2009), also known as Ellen Swomley Stewart, was an American physicist. She taught at the New Jersey College for Women and Connecticut College for Women before researching sonar at the Navy Electronics Laboratory. Stewart was elected a Fellow of the American Physical Society in 1965.

== Early life and education ==
Stewart was the daughter of Mr. and Mrs. Daniel Swomley. At five months of age, she and her family moved from her birth state of Pennsylvania to Cedar Rapids, Iowa. Her education came in that city's elementary schools and Franklin High School, from which she graduated in 1936. She graduated from Coe College in 1941. Her interest in physics developed from her work as a typist in Coe's physics department. She enrolled in physics to better understand what she was typing, and her interest grew enough that she changed majors. Her 1941 honor's thesis was titled, A simple method of visual spectrophotometry.

Stewart enrolled in Johns Hopkins University for graduate work, choosing its offer of a double scholarship and a teaching assistantship over offers from other universities. While there, she met James Stewart, another student in the program. They completed their doctorates and married in 1945. Her dissertation was published in Physical Review and was titled Dispersion of the velocity and anomalous absorption of sound in hydrogen.

== Career ==
Stewart taught at New Jersey College for Women (affiliated with Rutgers University), and Connecticut College for Women before moving to San Diego in 1951. After the move, she worked for the Naval Electronics Laboratory. Her classified activities focused on the use of sonar to detect mines and submarines.

== Selected publications ==
- Stewart, Ellen Swomley (1946-06-01). "Dispersion of the Velocity and Anomalous Absorption of Sound in Hydrogen". Physical Review. 69 (11–12): 632–640. doi:10.1103/PhysRev.69.632.
- Stewart, James L.; Stewart, Ellen S. (1950-01-01). "Ultrasonic Interferometry for Low Acoustic Impedance". Physical Review. 77: 143. doi:10.1103/PhysRevLett.13.437.
- Stewart, Ellen S.; Stewart, James L. (1964-10-05). "Acoustic Measurements of the Dispersion of Hypersonic Velocity in Liquids". Physical Review Letters. 13 (14): 437–438. doi:10.1103/PhysRevLett.13.437.
