= Ellen Brandt-Forster =

Austrian opera singer

Ellen Brandt-Forster, also Ellen Forster-Brandt (11 October 1866 – 16 July 1921) was an Austrian operatic soprano.

== Life ==
Born in Vienna, Brandt-Forster studied at the Wiener Konservatorium and first performed in Danzig in 1885. From 1887 to 1906 she appeared at the Vienna State Opera. In 1897 she became Kammersängerin.

She was considered an outstanding Wagner interpreter, but also performed successfully in concert halls, especially with Hugo Wolf's songs on Oesterreichisches Musiklexikon

She died in Baden bei Wien at age 54.
