= Ellen Covey =

Neurobiologist and perfumer

- Born: 26 September 1947 (age 78); Elmhurst, Illinois, United States
- Occupations: neurobiologist; researcher; perfumer; florist
- Notable work: Bat
- Website: orchidscents.com, olympicorchids.com

Ellen Covey is an American neurobiologist, researcher, perfumer and professor in the Department of Psychology at the University of Washington. Member Association for Research in Otolaryngology, Society for Neurosci., European Neurosci. Association, Sigma Xi.

== Early life and career ==
Born in the United States, Covey's family moved throughout Europe and lived in Switzerland, France, Germany, and Italy during her childhood. She studied premed at the University of Houston and received a master's degree in biology from the University of Texas. At Duke University, she studied chemical senses for her dissertation and got a post-doc at Princeton studying the visual system. She lives in North Seattle Washington, and is a professor of Department of Psychology and affiliate of the Bloedel Hearing Research Center at the University of Washington. Her work centers on mammalian central nervous system, with a research focus on the auditory process of bats and echolocation.

As a perfumer, Covey is the founder and perfumer of Olympic Orchids Artisan Perfumes. She won the 2015 Art & Olfaction Award Artisan prize for Olympic Orchid's Woodcut in and placed as a 2014 Artisan category finalist for Olympic Orchid's Blackbird. She also has collaborated with Canadian perfume house Zoologist on Bat (2016), which won the Independent prize at the 2016 Art and Olfaction Awards. Bat was discontinued in 2019 when Zoologist began moving toward a business model where all fragrances would be produced by a single manufacturer. Covey declined to sell Bat's proprietary formula, instead re-releasing the fragrance under the Olympic Orchids label as Night Flyer in 2020.

Covey also runs an orchid nursery, which instigated and informs her work as a perfumer. Her interest in orchids started at the Duke Medical Center's Immunobiology Department, when she received several orchid plants from a faculty member.

== Creations ==
=== Olympic Orchids ===
The Devil Scents	Scents of Place	Peace-Love-Perfume Project

Year	Creations								
Year	2010	Carolina	Kingston Ferry	Golden Cattleya	Red Cattleya	Javanica	Elektra	Olympic Rainforest	Tucson (Arizona)
2011	Olympic Amber	Gujarant	Kyphi	Osafume	Fleurs de Glace				
2012	Salamanca	Sonnet XVII	Bay Rum	Ballets Rouges	Dev #1: Foreplay	Dev #2: The Main Act	Dev #3: The Inevitable	Dev #4: Reprise	LIL
2013	Blackbird	Cafe V	Tropic of Capricorn	Seattle Chocolate	California Chocolate				
2014	Sakura	Woodcut	African Orchid	PLP1 Peace	PLP2 Love	PLP3 Perfume			
2015	Mardi Gras	White Cattleya							
2017	Chevalier Vert	Hamsa							
2018	Kilauea								
2020	Night Flyer								

=== Zoologist ===
- Bat (2016)
