= Ellen Morphonios =

American judge

Ellen James Morphonios (September 30, 1929 – December 22, 2002) was a Dade County, Florida Circuit Judge, remembered for having prosecuted rock star Jim Morrison (The Doors) for allegedly exposing himself in her early days as a prosecutor. She was nicknamed "Maximum Morphonios" for the long sentences she routinely handed down to violent criminals.

== Personal life ==
A native of Hyde County, North Carolina, Morphonios was a former model and beauty queen who passed a Florida exam that allowed her to enter law school without an undergraduate degree. She was also a member of Mensa International - the international organization for people with intelligence quotients in the top 2%.

Morphonios was a member of the National Rifle Association of America, and was invited to address the 1990 annual convention in Anaheim. She appeared on many talk shows, including Donahue, Oprah and 60 Minutes, and was a frequent guest panelist on CNN.

== Career ==
Her highest profile case was probably her prosecution of Jim Morrison for allegedly exposing himself at a 1969 concert in Miami. He was convicted, but the verdict was appealed by Morrison, who died in 1971 before the appeal could be considered.

== Autobiography ==
She wrote an autobiography in 1991, Maximum Morphonios: The Life and Times of America's Toughest Judge (ISBN 0688091555).

== Retirements ==
Morphonios retired following a series of corruption allegations that targeted a number of Dade County judges; although the federal government investigated her and introduced attempts to bribe her as evidence in its trials of the other judges implicated in the scandal, prosecutors ultimately did not charge Morphonios herself. She returned briefly to the bench in 1997 but retired again after new bribery allegations came to light.

== Death ==
Ellen Morphonios died on Sunday, December 22, 2002, from stomach cancer.
