= Ellen Johnson (disambiguation) =

Ellen Johnson (born 1955) is an American activist. The name may also refer to:

- Ellen Cheney Johnson (1829–1899), American prison reformer
- Ellen H. Johnson (1910–1992), American historian and professor of modern art
- Ellen Johnson Sirleaf (born 1938), president of Liberia and Nobel Peace Prize winner
