= Ellen Venker =

Dutch softball player (born 1983)

Ellen Venker (born 26 November 1983 in Boskoop) is a Dutch softball player, who represents the Dutch national team in international competitions.

Venker played for Alphians, Schiedam, DSC '74, Euro Stars and since 2007, for Central Michigan University. She is a catcher who bats both left and right-handed and throws right-handed. She competes for the Dutch national team since 2002. In 2005, she stole the most bases in the Dutch Softball Hoofdklasse. She is part of the Dutch team for the 2008 Summer Olympics in Beijing.
