= Ellen Davis =

Ellen Davis may refer to:

- Ellen F. Davis (born 1950), American theologian and Old Testament scholar
- Ellen Davis (businesswoman) (born 1978 or 1979), American businesswoman who coined the phrase "Cyber Monday"
- Ellen Davis (née Bassel; died 1943), second wife of ambassador John W. Davis
