= Ellen Baker =

Ellen Baker may refer to:

- Ellen S. Baker (born 1953), American physician and NASA astronaut
- Ellen Harding Baker (1847–1886), American astronomer and teacher
- Ellen Baker (fictional tutor), a character featured in the 2016–2019 edition of New Horizon, a widely used Japanese textbook for teaching English to middle-school students
