= Ellen Sheidlin =

Russian photoblogger and painter (born 1994)

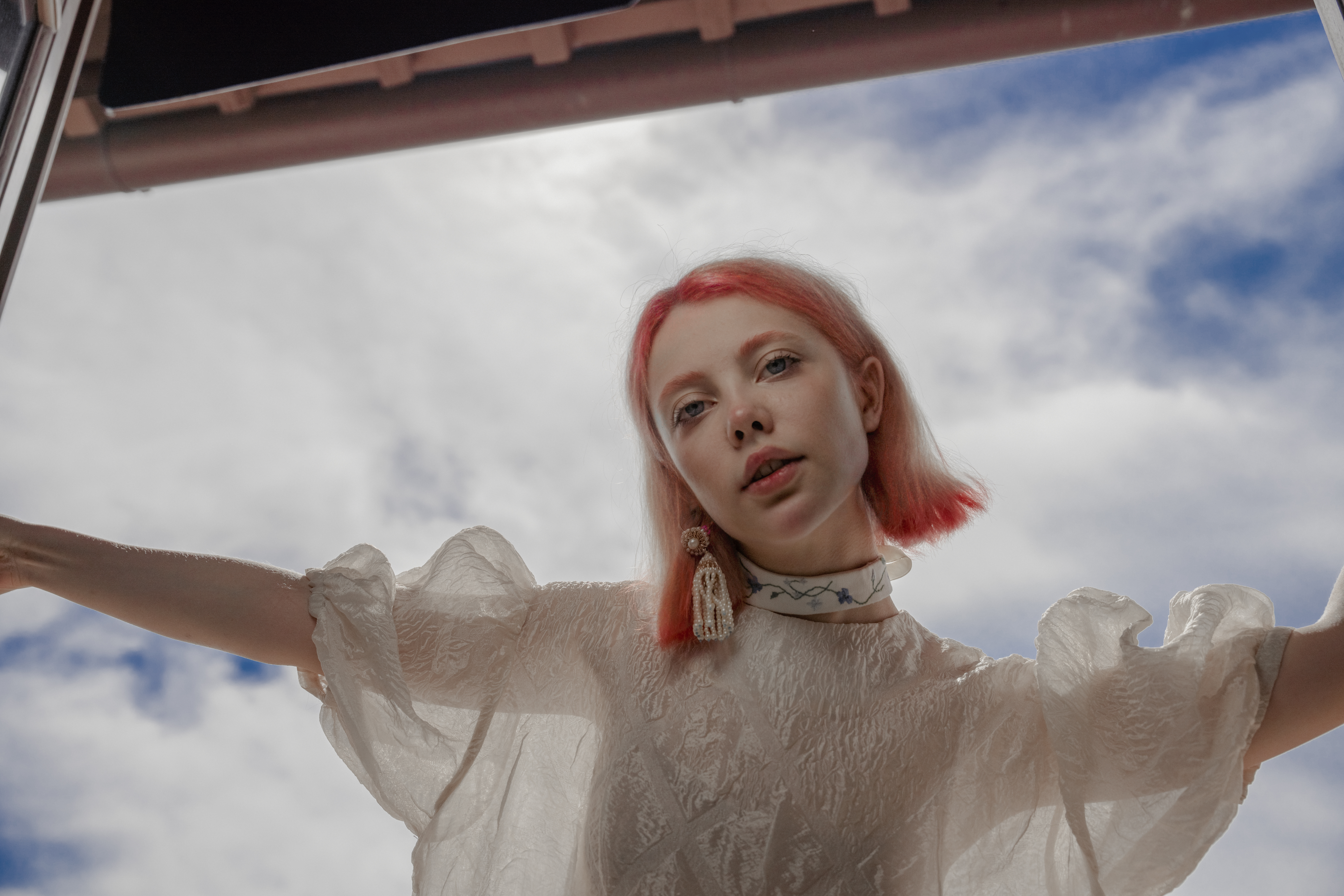
- Born: Elena Viktorovna Lyalina; 30 June 1994 (age 32); Saratov, Russia
- Other names: Elena Sheidlina; Lena Terry
- Occupations: Photoblogger; painter

Instagram information
- Page: Ellen Sheidlin
- Years active: 2012–present
- Followers: 4,4 million (16 December 2022)

Ellen Sheidlin (née Elena Viktorovna Lyalina; born June 30, 1994), also known as Elena Sheidlina, is a Russian photoblogger and painter.

== Early life and education ==
Ellen was born on June 30, 1994, in Saratov. After graduating from the 9th grade of secondary school, in 2010 she entered the Saratov State College of Book Business and Information Technology. After graduation in 2013 she moved to St. Petersburg, where she began her creative career in the genre of art photography. In 2016 she graduated from the Faculty of Advertising and Public Relations of Synergy University in Moscow. In 2021–2022 years she studied at the Accademia di Belle Arti di Firenze.

== Career ==
Ellen creates digital photographs and videos, works in the genres of sculpture and painting. Since 2021, she has been actively using technology NFT.

Ellen herself calls the method developed by her — survirtualism, implying a mixture of digital and physical components in the works. Most often, she uses her own image to create works.

In July 2017 her first solo exhibition, “Sheidlin`s Universe” took place in St. Petersburg. Subsequently, Ellen's exhibitions were held in Tokyo, Florence, London, Paris, New York and Melbourne.

In February 2018 she was (together with Kate Adushkina, Herman Chernykh, Room Factory and Sasha Ice) nominated for a Nickelodeon Kids' Choice Awards in the category "Favorite Internet star of Russian viewers", but at the March ceremony the prize got Herman Chernykh. In April of the same year, she won the Glamour Influencers Award in the nomination #glam_artproject.

Since the beginning of her creative career, Ellen has been using social networks as the main platform for demonstrating her work. Since 2012, she has been running the main blog @sheidlina in Instagram. In 2017, she created a profile @sheidlinart dedicated to her own art works made by the method of painting.

In 2023, Sheidlin was a juror for the Beautiful Bizarre Art Prize 2023 in the Photography category.

Critics often compare her work with the work of Cindy Sherman, Marina Abramović and Andy Warhol.

By Ellen's own admission, she has been influenced by artists such as Salvador Dalí, René Magritte, Joan Miró and Max Ernst.

== Solo exhibitions ==
- 2017 — Scheidlin's Universe.Artmuza, Saint Petersburg.
- 2020 — Transformations. Vanilla Gallery, Tokyo.
- 2021 — Spinning in Mirrors. Palazzo Imperatore, Palermo.
- 2021 — Comprehended by Fantasy. TSH Gallery, Florence.
- 2022 — Materialization of Sensual ideas. Art in space gallery, Dubai.
- 2024 — NOISE. Beinart Gallery. Melbourne

== Private life ==
On June 1, 2018, she announced that she had married Yevgeny Sheidlin.

On March 30, 2020, she announced her name change on her Twitter account.

On March 9, 2025, she announced her divorce from Sheidlin in an Instagram post. In the caption, she mentions that her divorce took place on September 9, 2024, and in the comments, in response to a user, she mentions that she will still keep "Sheidlin" as a nickname.

== Bibliography ==
- Ellen Sheidlin. Ellen in Sheidlinland. 2020. ISBN 978-4-86152-780-7.

== Awards and nominations ==
Year	Award	Category	Result	Ref.
2016	INSTA Awards	INSTA of the world	Won	
2016	Pudra Blogger Awards	Instagram Blogger of the Year	Won	
2017	Neforum Awards	Fashion Blog	Won	
2017	Neforum Awards	Creative project	Won	
2018	Nickelodeon Kids' Choice Awards	Favorite Internet star of Russian viewers	Nominated	
2018	Glamour Influencers Awards	Glam Art Project	Won	
2020	Shorty Awards	Instagrammer	Nominated	
2022	World Influencer Business Awards	The NFT Influencer	Won	
