= Ellen McCarthy =

American urban planner

Ellen M. McCarthy

Director of the Office of Planning of the District of Columbia
- In office 2004–2007
- Appointed by: Anthony A. Williams

Personal details
- Education: University of Maryland Harvard University (MUP)
- Profession: Urban planner
- Known for: Development policies in the District of Columbia, in the United States: Deputy Director for Development Review, Neighborhood Planning, and Historic Preservation in the District of Columbia, in the United States; Director, DC Downtown Partnership; Director of Planning and Land Use, Arent Fox (District of Columbia office)

Ellen M. McCarthy is the director of the Office of Planning for the District of Columbia, in the United States. She previously served in that position from 2004 to 2007. Appointed by Mayor Anthony Williams, She was forced out of the position by wealthy Ward 3 homeowner groups who resented her development policies.

Before then, she served as deputy director for Development Review, Neighborhood Planning and Historic Preservation. McCarthy was former director of the DC Downtown Partnership, a group fostering revitalization of the historic downtown section of the city. She also ran a private practice in land use and transportation planning.

Between terms, she served as Director of Planning and Land Use at the District of Columbia office of Arent Fox.

She attended the University of Maryland, and has a Master of Urban Planning from Harvard University.
