= Ellen Lahn =

Norwegian politician

Ellen Lahn (19 January 1918 - 30 August 2004) was a Norwegian politician for the Socialist Left Party.

She served as a deputy representative to the Norwegian Parliament from Hordaland during the term 1973–1977, representing the Socialist Electoral League.

== See also ==
- Politics of Norway
