= Ellen Marx =

Ellen Marx may refer to:

- Ellen Marx (human rights activist) (1921–2008), refugee from Nazi Germany who became a leader in the Argentinian Mothers of the Plaza de Mayo movement after her youngest daughter was disappeared
- Ellen Marx (artist) (born 1939), French-German author, of reference books about colour, originally from Saarbrücken
