= Ellen White (Snuneymuxw First Nation) =

Canadian Indigenous elder (c. 1922–2018)

- Kwulasulwut

Snuneymuxw leader

Personal details
- Born: Ellen Rice c. 1922
- Died: 2018 (aged 95–96) Nanaimo, British Columbia, Canada
- Spouse: Doug White
- Children: 1
- Nickname: Nanaimo's Auntie Ellen

Ellen White (c. 1922 – 2018) of the Snuneymuxw First Nation is a Canadian aboriginal elder, author, and academic who has been recognized with a national Order of Canada and provincial Order of British Columbia.

The daughter of Charles Rice and Hilda Wesley, Ellen White grew up in the Gulf Islands on Norway and Kuper Islands. She did not attend the Kuper Island Indian Residential School as she did not have Indian status. She trained as a midwife at a young age, assisting at births when she was just 9 years old, and delivering children by age 16. She moved to Nanaimo, British Columbia after marrying Douglas John White, and raised her five children in the Nanaimo First Nation.

After 30 years as a lecturer and storyteller at University of British Columbia, White was instrumental in establishing the First Nations Studies program at Vancouver Island University (then Malaspina College) in 1994, and spent 13 years there as an Elder-in-Residence. Known as "Auntie Ellen" to students, staff, and faculty, White received an Honorary Doctorate from VIU in 2006 for her years of dedication to education and community service. The Kwulasulwut Garden located at VIU's Nanaimo campus is dedicated to Dr. Ellen White using her Coast Salish name Kwulasulwut, meaning "many stars". The garden includes a totem pole by Coast Salish artist Jane Marston.

Ellen White is the grandmother of former Snuneymuxw Chief Douglas White III.

== Recognitions ==
- 2006 – Honorary Doctorate, Vancouver Island University
- 2007 – B.C. Community Achievement Award
- 2011 – Order of British Columbia (BC)
- 2016 – Order of Canada

== Publications ==
- Kwulasulwut: Stories From the Coast Salish (Theytus, 1981, 1992). Illustrated by David Neel.
- Kwulasulwut II (Theytus 1997). Illustrated by Bill Cohen.
