= Ellen Rosenbush =

American journalist

Ellen Rosenbush edited Harper's Magazine from 2010 to 2019. During her tenure the magazine won two National Magazine Awards and received a total of 12 nominations. Rosenbush, the fourteenth editor of the magazine, is the first woman to hold the editor position at Harper’s in its 164-year history.
