= Ellen Picard =

Canadian former law professor and judge

Ellen Irene Picard (born c. 1941) is a Canadian former law professor and judge. In 2017, she was named an Officer of the Order of Canada in recognition of her contributions as a legal scholar.

== Early life and education ==
Picard was born in 1941 and raised in the Crowsnest Pass. Her family first landed in Quebec in 1665 from Picardy in France and settled in Southern Alberta. She attended Strathcona High School and graduated in 1958 with the Grieedarf Trophy as an outstanding girl in the graduating class. During high school, she served as vice-president of the students' union, editor of the yearbook, and honorary president of the baton club. She also received the Rotary Club's annual "Adventure in Citizenship" on the basis of all-round school activities and earned a trip to Ottawa.

== Career ==
Picard completed her law degree from the University of Alberta and later joined their Faculty of Law as the first female full-time member and later served as Associate Dean. During her time at the University of Alberta, Picard established the Health Law Institute, the first research institute in Canada in the field of health law.

Picard was appointed to the Court of Queen's Bench in 1986, and elevated to the Court of Appeal in 1995. As there were few women on the Queen's Bench, there was no changing area for the female judges to change into their gowns. As a result, Picard and Nina Foster took turns standing guard outside the washroom as they changed. Upon being appointed in 1995, alongside Constance Hunt, Alberta Court of Appeal became the first province with more women than men sitting full time on its top court. In recognition of her contributions as a legal scholar, Picard was named an Officer of the Order of Canada in 2017.
