= Ellen Eliza Fitz =

American inventor, globe designer

Ellen Eliza Fitz (1835-1886) was an American inventor known for her design for a globe mounting system, the Fitz globe.

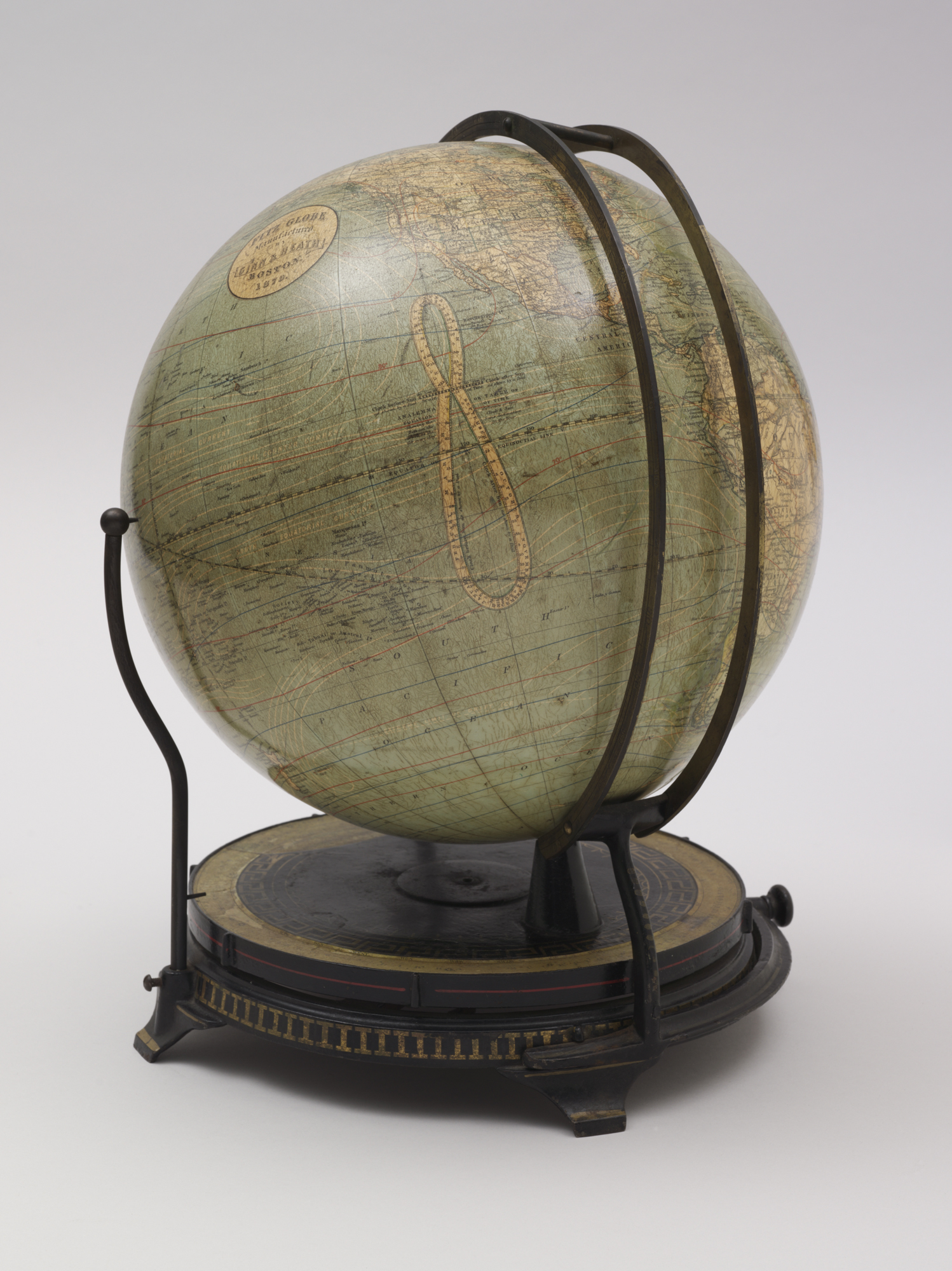
Fitz globe

== Early life ==
Ellen Eliza Fitz was born in 1835 in Kingston, New Hampshire. When she was a child, she moved to Massachusetts and grew up in Lynnfield and Newton. She grew to be scholarly and curious, spending most of her time as a teenager translating classical texts, such as the Eclogues of Virgil and publishing poetry. In 1853, at the age of 18, Fitz graduated from the West Newton State Normal School. She then worked as a music teacher in Cambridge, Massachusetts, where her passion for educating blossomed. She also developed a passion for map making, which would later turn into an extraordinary innovation. In her adulthood, Fitz spent a significant amount of her time in Saint John, New Brunswick, Canada, where she worked as a governess and educator. In New Brunswick, her ideas for the design, production, and manufacture for the globe and globe mounting system began.

== The Fitz Globe ==
In 1875, at the age of 40, Fitz's invention that, even today, can be found in classrooms and school across the country and throughout the world, was given a patent. This invention was for a globe mounting system of vertical rings, known as the ‘Fitz Globe’. These rings that were included on the mounting of the globe were intended to portray changes from day to night, across all four seasons. This was extremely beneficial in allowing students to understand the way in which the Earth rotates and revolves, and how this amounts to the seasons we experience. It allowed teachers, professors, and educators to visually communicate these concepts. Fitz sought to target the frustration of globes lacking a proper mountain system, and educating regarding astronomy and geography being communicated poorly. The globes themselves, used with the Fitz mountains, were standard globes of the century. However, they were elevated significantly by the mountain system that displayed earth's changing daylight.

Fitz was the first woman to be involved in globe manufacturing, seeing as the globes used with the mountings were published by two men - Gilman and A.K Johnson. As geographical discoveries progressed, and most major land masses had been explored, the globes became very thorough, detailed, and accurate, and even showed ocean currents, and average isotherms. Fitz's contribution to the globe was crucial for educators being able to properly teach and explain the complexity of this globe. The globe's base could be turned in relation to a pointer that represented the Sun's vertical ray. Fitz wrote and published a guidebook to go with the Fitz globe mounting system. The guidebook, titled, Handbook of the Terrestrial Globe or Guide to Fitz's New Method of Mounting and Operating Globes, was written to make the globe understandable and user friendly, whilst promoting her innovations. In the guidebook, there is a description of the globe mounting system and instructions regarding how it is to be used, in addition to exercises on various school subjects. These subjects include geometry, geography and astronomy, The exercises range from finding difference in longitude for different cities, to finding lengths of day and night.

== Death and legacy ==
Fitz died four years after receiving her second patent, aged 51, in 1866. She died from an unknown long illness in Watertown, Massachusetts, but her legacy lived on. Object teaching was heavily promoted during this time, and students learned mainly through interacting with various toys, objects and demonstrations. This is why the globe and the globe mountain were so heavily used during this time. Teaching has transitioned to being more reliant on technology, and less on physical models, so the globe is gradually becoming obsolete. However, it is still a useful tool for younger children who benefit from visual demonstration.

=== Selected publications ===
- Fitz, Ellen E. (1876). Hand-book of the terrestrial globe : or, guide to Fitz's new method of mounting and operating globes, designed for the use of families, schools, and academies / by Ellen E. Fitz. University of California Libraries. Boston : Ginn Brothers.
