= Happehatchee Center =

Coordinates: 26°26′4″N 81°48′30″W

The Happehatchee Center is a nature sanctuary and spiritual center operated by a non-profit organization in Estero, Florida. It is located on 4.5 acres of subtropics forest, spanning 150 feet on both sides of the Estero River. It is adjacent to the Koreshan State Historic Site and together these lands host a variety of flora and fauna along the river.

== History ==
=== Girl Scouts ===
In 1947 the Girl Scouts of the USA acquired a camp site in Estero and purchased two buildings from Buckingham Army Airfield which were moved to the camp. In 1954 the land was deeded to the Lee County Council of Girl Scouts.

The Girl Scout camp was named Camp Caloosa at Estero from the 1940s to the 1960s. The main house was a WWII bunker, used for overnight camping. Among the camp activities in the 1940s were solar cooking contests. The property between the pond and Girl Scout butterfly garden was cleared in the early 1950s for tents, and trees were put in to line the main driveway from Corkscrew to the Estero River. During the 1950s the Girl Scouts camped and held meetings and ceremonies on this land. On August 15, 1962 the Caloosa Council of Girl Scouts, formerly the Lee County Council of Girl Scouts, deeded over the land to the Girl Scouts of Gulfcoast Florida, a non-profit Florida corporation. In 1963 the Girl Scouts of Gulfcoast Florida sold the land to Herman and Catherine Polhamus, later building another camp in North Fort Myers.

=== Ellen Peterson ===
On November 6, 1972 Ellen Peterson an eco-warrior, acquired the property from Herman and Catherine Polhamus and began using it to host private retreats, classes and workshops by small groups, including the Girl Scouts. She named it Happehatchee, the Native American words for Happy River.

In 2006 Peterson established a non-profit eco-spiritual center for the Lee County community and named it Happehatchee Center. Upon her death October 14, 2011 her estate established a trust with a board of directors charged with making the property open to the public. Six months later the center was closed for two months while the programs were restructured. The Happehatchee Center building acquired from the Buckingham Airfield in 1947 was declared an Individual Historic Resource by the Lee County Historic Preservation Program on November 28, 2012.

== Activities ==
Happehatchee Center is used by a number of organizations who offer activities approved by the center's Board of Directors. The center's staff, volunteers and visitors participate in a variety of eco-friendly activities, including nature walks, gardening, permaculture, medicinal herbs, aquaponics, worm gardens, composting, bamboo propagation, bicycle repair and maintenance, bamboo arts, painting, Maya crafts, Girl and Boy Scout training, and campfires and Bridging ceremonies. The center has developed a Happehatchee Girl Scout Badge.

Spiritual and health activities at the center include religious ceremonies, labyrinth walks, life celebrations, weddings, memorial services, baptisms, Maya ceremonies, healing and drumming circles, Yoga, Tai Chi and QiGong, Reiki, Ayurveda and meditation. The center also hosts meetings of environmental groups and organized self-help classes.

The Center's gazebo is also used for musical performances.

== Facilities ==
The Happahatchee Center building includes Center office. Activities can use the kitchen, screened porch and large main room for smaller classes.

The forested property includes a river kayak launch, nature trail, fire circle and organic garden. There is a mature bamboo forest. The Peace Pavilion, an octagon shaped and palm thatched screened building, has an access ramp and provides open space under shelter. There is also a Workshop building used to for gardening, art and craft and bike maintenance workshops. The River House includes sleeping quarters for small retreats. A screened porch provides space for healing and health classes. The house is accessible via a swing bridge or by car from the north bank of the river. This building is the meeting point for activities on the north bank, including the Labyrinth and organic garden. It is the last phase of development for Happechatchee Center. In 2013, Health and Safety requirements were limiting the activities on the north bank.
