= Ellen Lax =

German physicist

Ellen Lax (August 27, 1885 – after 1974) was a German industrial physicist who became known through the publication of the three-volume reference work Taschenbuch für Chemiker und Physiker (Handbook for Chemists and Physicists) together with Jean D'Ans. The first volume appeared in 1943, and to this day the so-called "D'Ans-Lax" is widely used as a reference for laboratory work. She also worked on the Landolt-Börnstein table.

== Life ==
Lax grew up in a wealthy home in Minden, Germany. Her father worked as a manufacturer of biochemical products and a businessman. She completed the higher girls' school and received a late high school diploma in 1910 at the age of 25. She then studied in Berlin and received her doctorate in 1919 from Walther Nernst on electrical conductivity under pressure. Her studies were interrupted by the First World War until 1918, during which time she worked as an X-ray and operating room nurse as well as a bacteriologist and laboratory assistant.

== Scientific work ==
In 1919, shortly after completing her doctorate, she began working for Osram in Berlin. In 1925, in collaboration with Marcello Pirani, she developed two processes for the production of the interior frosting of light bulbs at the Osramgesellschaft in Berlin, which were patented by the Osram company in 1927. In 1934 she published a detailed article on lighting technology. She worked in Pirani's scientific department until Pirani emigrated in 1936, after which she began work on the Handbook for Chemists and Physicists for Springer-Verlag, to which she had already come into contact through her publications in the Handbuch der Lichttechnik (Lighting Technology Handbook). In 1945 she had to interrupt her work for Springer-Verlag and found a job at the Institute for Teaching Aids Research in the Faculty of Education at Humboldt University. In 1950 she continued to work on the tables for Springer-Verlag. She also contributed to the Handbook of Physics.
