= Ellen E. Peck =

American criminal (c. 1830s–c. 1925)

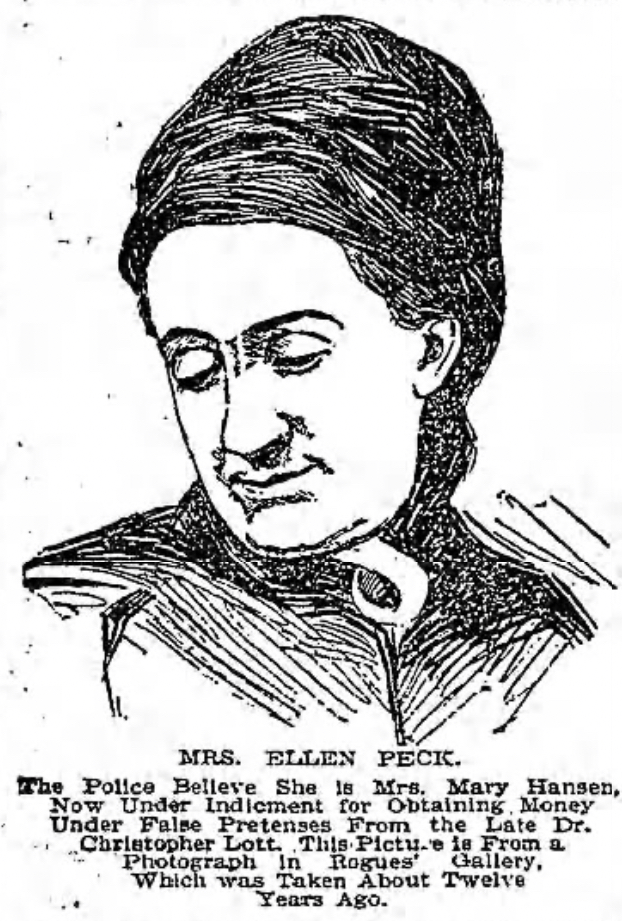
Ellen Peck circa 1885 from Brooklyn Daily Eagle

Ellen Eliza Knight Peck (c. 1830s – after 1927) was an American criminal sometimes called "Confidence Queen." She was known for defrauding businessmen.

== Career ==
Before her first arrest, Peck aided the police in the capture of other criminals.

In 1878, she swindled a soap manufacturer out of $19,000 by pretending to be a female detective following up about a previous robbery. She was indicted for this, but every time the case came up for trial she pretended to take ill. Shortly after, she allegedly stole $2,700 from a patent medicine man by pretending to know insider information about stocks to procure a bribe from him. In 1879, she was tried and acquitted by the Kings County Court of Sessions on the charge of obtaining several thousand dollars worth of jewelry under false pretenses.

Peck was arrested again in 1881 for allegedly defrauding a jeweler of $150 worth of jewelry under the pseudonym Mrs. Eliza Knight. In 1885, she was sentenced to four and a half years of prison time for the crime of forging a bond to obtain $3,000 from the Mutual Life Insurance Company of New York.

Described by Thomas F. Byrnes as a "dangerous confidence woman" in Professional Criminals of America in 1886, she was estimated to be about 50 years old. In 1897 she was in the Tombs for an alleged theft of jewelry.

When she was arrested in 1908 in New York City for grand larceny, the New York Times called her the "Confidence Queen" and claimed she was over 70 years of age. The grand larceny in question was the title to 225,000 acres of land in the state of Kentucky.

She was pardoned by New York Governor Dix and released from prison in 1911 at age 82 on account of being "too old" to be a menace to society, five years earlier than was dictated by her sentence. In 1925, she gave an interview to the New York Daily News, claiming that she would tell the full story of her life only when her daughter, Sarah, dies. In the interview, Peck said, "Every single person who ever did me any whong, except my daughter, has died – and I'll outlive her too." In 1927, at the age of 97, she claimed have left for California to live with her daughter.

Over the span of her lifetime, Peck spent more than 13 years incarcerated.

== Personal life ==
Peck was married to William W. Peck. She had a daughter, Mrs. Sarah Etta Parsons, to whom she was estranged, and a granddaughter, who she had never met.
