= Ellen Botwin =

American Producer

Ellen Botwin is a Broadway producer. She was formerly a teacher.

== Career ==
Botwin got her start in producing with an investment in Sweeney Todd which came about via a connection at Guilford High School in Connecticut, where she was a special education teacher. Botwin produces Broadway musicals with her husband Howard Ignal. They have produced musicals and plays on Broadway such as Tommy, Cabaret, Merrily We Roll Along, and The Sign in Sidney Brustein's Window.

== Awards ==
Botwin was nominated for a Tony Award when her production of Tommy was nominated for Best Revival of a Musical.
