= Ellen Seip =

Norwegian civil servant (born 1949)

Ellen Seip (born 17 October 1949) is a Norwegian civil servant.

She graduated from the University of Oslo as cand.sociol. in 1976. She worked for Oslo municipality from 1977 to 1980, and was then hired by the Ministry of Social Affairs. She was promoted to assistant secretary in 1987, deputy under-secretary of State in 1999 and permanent under-secretary of State in 2001. The ministry was later renamed into the Ministry of Labour and Social Inclusion.

Seip was a member of the board of the INAS from 1990 to 1996.
