= Ellen Ernst Kossek =

American academic and social scientist

Ellen Ernst Kossek is an American academic and social scientist who is known for research on work, family, and personal life. She is the Basil S. Turner Distinguished Professor at Purdue University’s Mitchell E. Daniels, Jr. School of Business. She previously served as the Research Director of the Susan Bulkeley Butler Center for Leadership Excellence for Purdue University’s Provost’s Office and as a University Distinguished Professor at Michigan State University’s School of Human Resources and Labor Relations. She received her Bachelor of Arts degree from Mount Holyoke College, her Master of Business Administration from the Stephen M. Ross School of Business at the University of Michigan and her Ph.D from Yale University. She has work experience in international and strategic human resource management working in Asia, Europe and the U.S. for Hitachi, IBM & GTE. Dr. Kossek works globally to advance knowledge on gender and diversity, employment practices to support work and family, and the development of leader and positive workplace cultures to support well-being and productivity. Her research has been featured in national and international media such as the Financial Times, National Public Radio, the Wall Street Journal, Forbes magazine, Time magazine, Marketplace, and the Washington Post.

== Experience ==
Prior to becoming a chaired professor at Purdue, she was awarded the rank of University Distinguished Professor at Michigan State University. She has been a visiting scholar at King's College London, Harvard Business School, the University of Adelaide, Australia, and the University of Michigan's Institute of Social Research, University of Warwick, and Center for Education of Women (awarded a Jean Campbell Fellowship). She has worked for global companies in international and strategic human resource management and workforce diversity in Asia, Europe and the U.S. for Hitachi, IBM, Deere & Co. & GTE. She works globally to advance knowledge on gender and diversity, employment practices to support work, family and personal life, flexibility and the development of leader and positive workplace cultures to support well-being and productivity.

Her research has won awards including the Rosabeth Moss Kanter award for research excellence, the Families and Work Institutes' Work-Life Legacy award for helping to build or advance the work-life movement and the Academy of Management's Gender and Diversity Division's Sage Scholarly achievement award for advancing understanding of gender and diversity in organizations. In 2023, Purdue University awarded her the Title IX Distinguished Service award for her advancement of gender equity in education. She was the first elected president of the Work-Family Researchers Network, a founding member of the Work Family Health Network and elected a Fellow in the American Psychological Association and the Society for Industrial and Organizational Psychology, and the Academy of Management. In 2023, Dr. Kossek was appointed to the National Academies of Sciences as an Expert on the Committee on Polices and Practices for Family caregivers working in Science, Engineering, and Medicine. She has won grants from the Alfred P. Sloan Foundation, the Russell Sage Foundation, the National Science Foundation, and the U.S. National Institutes of Health to study linkages between workplace flexibility and productivity and well-being for U.S. Employees across many jobs and industries. She was elected to serve on the Academy of Management's Board of Governors, and Chair, of the Gender & Diversity in Organizations Division. She has won distinguished faculty teaching awards for multiple years at Purdue. She has been invited to give keynote speeches to managers, scholars, students and policymakers in over a dozen countries. She has written reports on workplace flexibility for SHRM, the inspector general of the U.S. Postal Service and a thought paper on work-life strategies for a U.S. Office of Personnel Management conference. She was founding co-editor of the Sloan Work Family Network's Work and Family Encyclopedia, and served on an Alfred P. Sloan Foundation sponsored Teaching Advisory Board and Task Forces on Web-Based Collaborative learning and Workplace Flexibility. She also serves or has served on the Executive Advisory Boards of a Work and Family and the IESE's 5th annual International Conference of Work & Family in Spain, and the State of Michigan YMCA Camp Arbutus Hayo-Went-Ha.

== Research interests ==
Kossek specializes in advancing research to practice in organizations and society in the following areas: employer support of work, family, and personal life, technology and Work-life boundaries, gender and leadership, Work place Flexibility, Talent Management of Gender & Multicultural Diversity, and Work, Family, and Health organizational change initiatives.

== Publications ==
Kossek has written, edited and published well over 100 books, book chapters and journal articles. She has been published in numerous journals, which include the Academy of Management Journal, Personnel Psychology, the Industrial and Labor Relations Review, Journal of Applied Psychology, California Management Review, Harvard Business Review, Academy of Management Annals, and many more. She is well known for her co-authored book CEO of Me: Creating a Life that Works in the Flexible Job Age. Dr. Kossek and her research has been cited in national and international media including NPR, Forbes, CNN, Huffington Post, Washington Post, the Financial Times, the Atlantic, Time Magazine, Rolling Stone, New York Times, Wall Street Journal and Wharton Sirius Radio.
