= Ellen E. Armstrong =

American stage magician

- Born: January 27, 1914
- Died: 1979 (aged 64–65); Spartanburg, South Carolina
- Occupation: stage magician
- Years active: 1920–1970

Ellen E. Armstrong (January 27, 1914 – 1979) was an American stage magician. She was the only African American woman of the early- to mid-twentieth century to run an independent touring magic show. Armstrong followed in the steps of her father J. Hartford Armstrong, known as the "King of the Colored Conjurers," taking over his act when he died in 1939. She continued the act for an additional thirty years after his death, performing in venues such as churches and schools.

== Early life and education ==
Ellen E. Armstrong was born January 27, 1914. Her parents were John Hartford Armstrong, an African American man, and Mabel White, a white woman who acted as the assistant in John's magic act. Mabel died shortly after giving birth to Ellen. John remarried, and his new wife Lille Belle (also spelled Lily or Lillie) Mills joined him in his magic act. Ellen's father and stepmother formed the core of the magic and illusion show; they were sometimes joined by his brother and members of the Jordan family. The Armstrong family performed at schools, churches, opera houses, auditoriums, and other venues, focusing on humor in their act. They also performed along the eastern seaboard of the United States, from Key West to Philadelphia, and newspaper ads claimed that they had toured in Cuba and Europe.

Ellen joined her family's act when she was just six years old. As a young performer, she developed a number of her own tricks, including a mind-reading act where she would touch people's heads and describe what they were thinking about the person sitting next to them. Ellen also developed her own segment of the show called "Chalk Talk," where she would draw cartoons from doodles.

In addition to learning show business from her father, she graduated from Barber–Scotia College in Concord, North Carolina.

== Solo career ==
In 1939, when Ellen was twenty-five, her father died of a heart attack. She inherited the show and $8,500 worth of props, and decided to continue touring as The Armstrong Magic Show. Armstrong continued to use her father's motto, "Going Fine Since 1889."

Armstrong adopted the nickname the "Mistress of Modern Magic". She continued her father's tradition of incorporating African American cultural icons in her show, including an image of revered boxer Joe Louis in "The Sand Frame" illusion. Armstrong knew traditional magic tricks such as "Miser's Dream," "The Puzzling Parasol," and "Hippity-Hop Rabbits." Other tricks in her repertoire include: "The Birth of Roses" and "The Mysterious Jars of Egypt." She later revised her "Chalk Talk" act to use a large sketchpad and colorful markers, giving away the finished cartoons as souvenirs for children in the audience. After her father's death, Armstrong performed for another thirty-one years, retiring in 1970.

== Personal life and death ==
Armstrong married a minister from North Carolina in the 1940s and they made their home in Spartanburg, South Carolina. In 1970, she stopped performing and retired to South Carolina. Armstrong died in Spartanburg in 1979.
