= Ellen Oppenheimer =

American quilter (born 1952)

- Born: 1952 (age 72–73); White Plains, NY
- Known for: quilting

Ellen Oppenheimer (born 1952) is an American quilter. Her work is included in the collections of the Smithsonian American Art Museum, the Rocky Mountain Quilt Museum and the International Quilt Museum. Oppenheimer also teaches art to Elementary students in Oakland, California.
