= Ellen Vilbaste =

Estonian botanist

Ellen Vilbaste (4 March 1893, Tartu – 14 February 1974, Kolga-Jaani) was an Estonian gardener and Estonia's first trained ethnobotanist. Eight hundred of her gathered specimens are held at the Estonian Plant Herbarium.

Her husband was botanist Gustav Vilbaste.
