= Ellen C. Covito =

Argentine composer (born 1974)

- Born: 1974 (age 50–51); Buenos Aires, Argentina
- Occupations: Composer, choreographer
- Website: ellenccovito.com

Ellen C. Covito (born 1974) is an Argentinian composer. She is known most for her Composed Improvisation and Improvised Composition series.

Covito's early works consisted in attempts to apply theoretical structures and ideas surrounding environmental problems to music.

Her works since 2009 deal with the dichotomy between composition and improvisation. She does this by introducing distance between the performer and what is performed, while removing the distance between the act of composition and performance.

In May 2012, the first concert of Covito's music outside Buenos Aires was organized in Brooklyn by Panoply Performance Laboratory and No Collective.

In September 2012, another concert of Covito's music was organized in Tokyo by No Collective and the Ensemble for Experimental Theatre and Music.
