= Ellen Langwith =

English businesswoman

- Died: 1481
- Occupations: Businesswoman silk crafter
- Spouses: Philip Waltham, John Langwith

Ellen Langwith (died 1481) was a successful English businesswoman and London silkwoman who was known to provide silk goods to the Royal Court in London.

== Life ==
Ellen was "already a successful businesswoman when she married her first husband," the London cutler (sword-making blacksmith) Philip Waltham. When Waltham died in 1426, Ellen continued his business and kept his workshop, and she also trained three female apprentices. She continued to run that business even after her next marriage to the tailor John Langwith, on 18 Jul 1437.

She became quite successful in the textile trade and joined the Fraternity of St John the Baptist of Tailors and Linen-Armourers in the mid-1400s. She was able to order gold thread and silk directly from Venice in 1439. As one of the best of her trade, she made deliveries to the Royal court. In 1465, she received an order for the silk banners and saddle decorations for the coronation of Queen Elizabeth Woodville (wife to King Edward IV), in London, an order that would have been given only to the finest crafters.

While she inherited from both husbands, Ellen had also amassed wealth through her own ventures. She operated very successfully in the silk trade under her own name, building a business where she sold to the royal household and trained her own apprentices.

She is known to have been an influential figure within the London business world. When she died in 1481 as the widow of a "fairly wealthy London tailor," she had no heirs. In her will, drawn up in 1480, she left the bulk of her estate to John Brown, who was one of her previous apprentices and a brother of her own serving maid. That said, "most of her bequests were to women."
