= Ellen Kandeler =

German biologist and agricultural scientist (born 1957)

Ellen Kandeler (born 16 June 1957, in Berlin) is a German biologist and agricultural scientist specialising in soil biology at University of Hohenheim. She also heads the Soil Biology area in the EU Biofector project.

== Life and work ==
After leaving school in Vienna in 1975 Kandeler studied biology at the University of Vienna and obtained a diploma in 1979. She then attained a doctorate in chemical plant physiology in 1983 at the same university, and afterwards worked as a scientific assistant at the State Institute of Soil Science in Vienna (1983 to 1995) and as a university lecturer at the Institute of Soil Science and Engineering Geology at the Zoological Institute at Vienna University (1987 to 1998). In parallel, she received habilitation with Venia legendi for the area of soil biology at the Vienna University of Soil Science in Vienna and took over as leader of Soil Microbiology Department and the Research Centre at the State Office of Agriculture in Vienna (1995 to 1998). She also became deputy to the Professor of Soil Biology and Ecology at the Agricultural Faculty of Halle-Wittenberg University. In 1998 Kandeler was invited to take up a Professorship in the area of soil biology at the Institute of Soil Science at Hohenheim University.

== Main fields of research ==
- Soil microbiology; microbial ecology; soil ecology
- Teaching emphasis: Deputy Head of the area soil biology for B.Sc., M.Sc. and Diploma students in the fields of Agricultural Science, Agricultural Biology and Biology; Geo- and Eco-Microbiology; Molecular Soil Microbiology; Biology of Soil Biochemistry; Biology of the Rhizosphere
- Managing Director of the Institute of Soil Science and member of the Faculty Board and the Large Instrument Commission (2000–2002)

== Memberships ==
- International Soil Science Society
- Society of German Agricultural Inspection and Research Institutes (VDLUFA)
- German Soil Science Society
- Soil Science Society of America

== Publications (selection) ==
- List of publications by Ellen Kandeler on the web pages of Hohenheim University
- Kandeler, F.; Kampichler, C.; Horak, O. (1996). "Influence of heavy metals on the functional diversity of soil microbial communities". Biology and Fertility of Soils. 23 (3). Springer Science and Business Media LLC: 299–306. doi:10.1007/bf00335958. ISSN 0178-2762. S2CID 22453704.
- Bradford, M. A.; Jones, T. H.; Bardgett, R. D.; Black, H. I. J.; Boag, B.; Bonkowski, M.; Cook, R.; Eggers, T.; Gange, A. C.; Grayston, S. J.; Kandeler, E.; McCaig, A. E.; Newington, J. E.; Prosser, J. I.; Setälä, H.; Staddon, P. L.; Tordoff, G. M.; Tscherko, D.; Lawton, J. H. (18 October 2002). "Impacts of Soil Faunal Community Composition on Model Grassland Ecosystems". Science. 298 (5593). American Association for the Advancement of Science (AAAS): 615–618. Bibcode:2002Sci...298..615B. doi:10.1126/science.1075805. ISSN 0036-8075. PMID 12386334. S2CID 8291806.
- Deiglmayr, Kathrin; Philippot, Laurent; Hartwig, Ueli A.; Kandeler, Ellen (2004). "Structure and activity of the nitrate-reducing community in the rhizosphere of Lolium perenne and Trifolium repens under long-term elevated atmospheric pCO2". FEMS Microbiology Ecology. 49 (3). Oxford University Press (OUP): 445–454. doi:10.1016/j.femsec.2004.04.017. ISSN 0168-6496. PMID 19712293.
- Ruess, Liliane; Schütz, Kirsten; Haubert, Dominique; Häggblom, Max M.; Kandeler, Ellen; Scheu, Stefan (2005). "Application of Lipid Analysis to Understand Trophic Interactions in Soil". Ecology. 86 (8). Wiley: 2075–2082. doi:10.1890/04-1399. ISSN 0012-9658.
- Kandeler, Ellen; Stemmer, Michael; Gerzabek, Martin H. (2005). "Role of Microorganisms in Carbon Cycling in Soils". Soil Biology. Vol. 3. Berlin/Heidelberg: Springer-Verlag. pp. 139–157. doi:10.1007/3-540-26609-7_7. ISBN 3-540-22220-0.

== Literature ==
- Ulrich Fellmeth: Ellen Kandeler im Hohenheimer Professorenlexikon; Die akademischen Lehrer an der Universität Hohenheim 1968 - 2005 (mit K. Quast), Stuttgart Seite 218 f.
