= Ellen E. Perry =

American classicist

Ellen Eva Perry (born 1965) is an American classicist and classical archaeologist. She is a Distinguished Professor of Arts and Humanities in the Department of Classics at the College of the Holy Cross in Worcester, Massachusetts.

== Early life and education ==
Perry is a native of Washington, D.C. She received her undergraduate education at Swarthmore College, earning a B.A. in 1987 with a major in Greek and a minor in Latin. As a graduate student at the University of Michigan she received an M.A. and a Ph.D. in classical art and archaeology. Her 1995 dissertation was entitled "Artistic Imitation and the Roman Patron with a Study of Imitation in the Ideal Sculptures of Herodes Atticus".

== Academic career ==
From 1995 to 1997 Perry was an assistant professor at the University of Evansville in Indiana. In 1997 she joined the faculty at the College of the Holy Cross, where she received tenure in 2004 and full professorship in 2017. From 2021 to 2025 she was the Monsignor Edward G. Murray Professor of Arts and Humanities, and from 2019 to 2023 she served as the director of the Holy Cross College Honors Program.

Perry is a fellow of the American Academy in Rome and a fellow of the American School of Classical Studies at Athens. In 2010–2011 she was the president of the Classical Association of New England and from 2014 to 2020 she served as the chair of the Program Committee for the annual meeting of the Archaeological Institute of America.

== Selected publications ==
=== Books ===
- Perry, Ellen E. (2005). The Aesthetics of Emulation in the Visual Arts of Ancient Rome. Cambridge: Cambridge University Press. ISBN 9780521831659.
- Perry, Ellen E.; Longfellow, Brenda, eds. (2018). Roman Artists, Patrons, and Public Consumption: Familiar Works Reconsidered. Ann Arbor: University of Michigan Press. doi:10.3998/mpub.9560572. ISBN 9780472130658.

=== Articles ===
- Perry, Ellen E. (2000). "Notes on Diligentia as a Term of Roman Art Criticism". Classical Philology. 95 (4). University of Chicago Press: 445–458. doi:10.1086/449511. JSTOR 270516.
- — (2002). "Rhetoric, Literary Criticism, and the Roman Aesthetics of Artistic Imitation". In Gazda, Elaine K. (ed.). The Ancient Art of Emulation: Studies in Artistic Originality and Tradition from the Present to Classical Antiquity. Memoirs of the American Academy in Rome, Supplement 1. pp. 153–171. doi:10.2307/4238450. JSTOR 4238450.* — (2001). "Iconography and the Dynamics of Patronage: A Sarcophagus from the Family of Herodes Atticus". Hesperia: The Journal of the American School of Classical Studies at Athens. 70 (4): 461–492. JSTOR 3182055.
- — (2008). "Divine Statues in the Works of Libanius of Antioch: The Actual and Rhetorical Desacralization of Pagan Cult Furniture in the Late 4th Century CE". In Eliav, Yaron Z.; Friedland, Elise A.; Herbert, Sharon (eds.). The Sculptural Environment of the Roman Near East: Reflections on Culture, Ideology, and Power. Leuven: Peeters. pp. 433–444. ISBN 9789042920040.
- — (2012). "The Same, But Different: The Temple of Jupiter Optimus Maximus through Time". In Wescoat, Bonna D.; Ousterhout, Robert G. (eds.). Architecture of the Sacred: Space, Ritual, and Experience from Classical Greece to Byzantium. Cambridge: Cambridge University Press. pp. 175–200. doi:10.1017/CBO9781139017640.007.
- — (2015). "Human Interactions with Statues". In Friedland, Elise A.; Sobocinski, Melanie Grunow; Gazda, Elaine E. (eds.). The Oxford Handbook of Roman Sculpture. Oxford: Oxford University Press. pp. 653–666. doi:10.1093/oxfordhb/9780199921829.001.0001. ISBN 9780199984640.
- — (2019). "Edward Robinson's Plaster Casts and the Battle for the Museum of Fine Arts". In English, Mary C.; Fratantuono, Lee M. (eds.). Pushing the Boundaries of Historia: Essays on Greek and Roman History and Culture in Honor of Blaise Nagy. Cambridge: Routledge. pp. 280–298. ISBN 9780367732691.
