= Ellen Stone =

Ellen Stone may refer to:

- Ellen M. Stone, American Protestant missionary kidnapped during the Miss Stone Affair
- Ellen Stone (horn player) (born 1917), American instrumentalist
