= Ellen Wondra =

American theologian

Ellen K. Wondra is an American theologian. She is research professor emerita of theology and ethics at the Bexley Seabury Theological Seminary Federation.

Wondra studied at Pomona College, the Church Divinity School of the Pacific and the University of Chicago Divinity School. She was formerly Editor in Chief of the Anglican Theological Review. In 2014 Wondra was elected to the Faith and Order Commission of the World Council of Churches.
