= Ellen Widder =

German historian (born 1955)

Ellen Widder (born 8 September 1955) is a German historian.

Ellen Widder studied history, geography, education and art history at the Universität Münster from 1975 to 1982. There she passed her first state examination in 1982. With Heinz Stoob she received her doctorate at the University of Münster in 1986 with a thesis on the rule of travel Karls IV. south of the Alps. From 1986 to 1989 she was a research assistant at the Collaborative Research Centre 231 "Carriers, Fields, Forms of Pragmatic Writing in the Middle Ages" at the University of Münster. From 1989 to 1995 Widder was scientific assistant at the University of Münster. In 1996, she also completed her habilitation there with the work Kanzler und Kanzleien. Eine Beitrag zur Strukturgeschichte der spätmittelalterlichen Landesherrschaft, which is now augmented and published as Kanzler und Kanzleien im Spätmittelalter. Eine Histoire croisée fürstlicher Administration im Südwesten des Reiches. She was a university lecturer in Münster from 1996 to 1997. This was followed in 1996/97 by deputies professorships at the University of Regensburg, the Humboldt University of Berlin and the Eberhard Karls University of Tübingen. Since October 1997 she has taught as Professor of Medieval History at the University of Tübingen. Widder has been a corresponding member of the Historical Commission for Westphalia since 1997 and a member of the Commission for Historical Regional Studies in Baden-Württemberg since July 2012.

Her research focuses on the imperial and constitutional history of the late Middle Ages, the urban history of the Middle Ages, the history of the late medieval courts and court orders, the history of Italy in the late Middle Ages, the late medieval administrative history, the Westphalian, Lower Saxon and southwestern German regional history, the nobility in the High Middle Ages and the history of the Electoral Palatinate.

== Writings ==
=== Monographs ===
- Itinerar und Politik. Studien zur Reiseherrschaft Karls IV. südlich der Alpen (= Forschungen zur Kaiser- und Papstgeschichte des Mittelalters. Bd. 10). Böhlau, Köln u. a. 1993, ISBN 3-412-06592-7 (Münster (Westfalen), Universität, Dissertation, 1986).
- Waiblingen. Eine Stadt im Spätmittelalter (= Waiblingen in Vergangenheit und Gegenwart. 16. Sonderband). Waiblingen 2005, ISBN 3-927981-14-1.
- Kanzler und Kanzleien im Spätmittelalter. Eine Histoire croisée fürstlicher Administration im Südwesten des Reiches (= Veröffentlichungen der Kommission für geschichtliche Landeskunde in Baden-Württemberg, Reihe B: Forschungen. Bd. 204). Kohlhammer Verlag, Stuttgart 2016, ISBN 978-3-17-028868-3

=== Editor ===
- Vom luxemburgischen Grafen zum europäischen Herrscher. Neue Forschungen zu Heinrich VII. (= Publications du CLUDEM. Bd. 23). CLUDEM, Luxembourg 2008, ISBN 2-919979-19-1.
- Manipulus florum. Aus Mittelalter, Landesgeschichte, Literatur und Historiographie. Festschrift für Peter Johanek zum 60. Geburtstag. Waxmann, Münster u. a. 2000, ISBN 3-89325-743-8.
- Vestigia monasteriensia: Westfalen – Rheinland – Niederlande (= Studien zur Regionalgeschichte. Bd. 5). Verlag für Regionalgeschichte Bielefeld 1995, ISBN 3-89534-110-X.
- Zwischen Bürgerstolz und Fürstenstaat. Soest in der frühen Neuzeit (= Soester Beiträge. Bd. 54). Westfälische Verlags-Buchhandlung Mocker und Jahn, Soest 1995, ISBN 3-87902-044-2.
