= Elena (given name) =

- Pronunciation: Italian: [ˈɛːlena] Spanish: [eˈlena]
- Gender: Female

Origin
- Origin: Greece
- Meaning: bright, shining light

Other names
- Related names: Ellen, Helen, Helena, Helene

Elena is a popular female given name of Greek origin. The name means "shining light". Nicknames of the name Elena are Lena, Lennie, Ella, Ellie, Nellie, or Nena (less common).

Other common variants are Alena (German, Czech, Russian, Belarusian, Serbian, Croatian); Alenka (Slovenian); Alyona (Russian); Elene (Georgian); Helen (English); Hélène (French); Helena (Latin, Polish); Eliana (Portuguese); Eline (Dutch, Norwegian, Sranan Tongo); Ileana (Romanian, Italian, Spanish); Ilona (Hungarian, Finnish, Latvian); Ilana (Greek); Olena (Ukrainian); Leena (Finnish); and Elena/Yelena/Jelena (Russian, Serbian, Croatian).

== Notable people ==
=== Given name ===
==== A–K ====
- Elena Abelson (1904–1993), better known as Tamara Talbot Rice, Russian-English art historian
- Elena Abramovich (born 1981), Belarusian handball player
- Elena Agafonnikova (born 1965), Russian basketball player
- Elena Aiello (1895–1961), Italian blessed
- Elena Akselrod, Russian poet and translator
- Elena Albu (1949–2003), Romanian actress
- Elena Aldunate (1925–2005), Chilean journalist and writer
- Elena Alexandrova (born 1950), Soviet figure skater
- Elena Alexieva (born 1975), Bulgarian writer
- Elena Alistar (1873–1955), Bessarabian politician
- Elena Allen (born 1972), British sport shooter
- Elena Altieri (1916–1997), Italian actress
- Elena Altsjoel (born 1964), Belarusian draughts player
- Elena Amat Calderón (1910–2006), Spanish university professor and archivist
- Elena Amato (born 1983), Italian gymnast
- Elena Anagnostopoulou (born 1967), Greek theoretical linguist
- Elena Anaya (born 1975), Spanish actress
- Elena Andreianova (1819–1957), Russian dancer
- Elena Andreicheva, Ukrainian documentary filmmaker
- Elena Andrieș (born 1994), Romanian weightlifter
- Elena Anguissola, 16th-century Italian artist
- Elena Aniushina (born 1993), Russian canoeist
- Elena Antoci (born 1975), Romanian middle-distance runner
- Elena Oana Antonescu (born 1979), Romanian politician
- Elena Apreleva (1846–1923), Russian writer
- Elena Aprile (born 1954), Italian experimental particle physicist
- Elena Arenas (born 2001), American artistic gymnast
- Elena Arifova (born 1972), Azerbaijani football player
- Elena Aristodimou (born 2002), Cypriot footballer
- Elena Arizmendi Mejía (1884–1949), Mexican feminist writer
- Elena Artamendi (born 1939), Spanish gymnast
- Elena Arzak (born 1969), Spanish chef
- Elena Arzhakova (born 1989), Russian runner who specializes in the middle-distance events
- Elena Asachi (1789–1877), Romanian pianist, singer and composer
- Elena Asimakopoulou (born 1984), Greek model
- Elena Azarova (born 1973), Russian synchronized swimmer
- Elena Bacaloglu (1878–c. 1947), Romanian journalist, literary critic, novelist and fascist militant
- Elena Bajo, Spanish painter
- Elena Ballesteros (born 1981), Spanish actress
- Elena Balletti (1686–1771), Italian actress and writer
- Elena Baltacha (1983–2014), British tennis player, born in Kyiv
- Elena Baranova (born 1972), Russian basketball player
- Elena Baravilala (born 1988), Fijian singer-songwriter
- Elena Barolo (born 1982), Italian actress, showgirl and vlogger
- Elena Barozzi (1514–1580), Venezuelan patrician
- Elena Barulina (1895–1957), Russian Soviet botanist and geneticist, expert on lentils.
- Elena Bascone (born 1995), Italian political economist
- Elena Băsescu (born 1980), Romanian politician
- Elena Bashir, American linguist
- Elena Bashkirova, Russian-Israeli classical pianist
- Elena Basile (born 1959), Italian diplomat and author
- Elena Batalova (born 1964), Russian freestyle skier
- Elena Batanova (born 1964), Soviet figure skater
- Elena Bechke (born 1966), Russian pair skater
- Elena Becker-Barroso, Spanish molecular biologist
- Elena Alexandrina Bednarik (1883–1939), Romanian painter
- Elena Beglova (born 1987), Russian basketball player
- Elena Belci (born 1964), Italian speed skater
- Elena Belle (born 1985), Swedish model
- Elena Bellò (born 1997), Italian middle-distance runner
- Elena Belova, several people
- Elena Benarroch (born 1955), Spanish fashion designer
- Elena Benítez (born 1966), Spanish taekwondo practitioner
- Elena Bennett (born 1972), American systems ecologist
- Elena Berezhnaya (born 1977), Russian pair skater
- Elena Berezovich (born 1966), Russian linguist
- Elena Berkova (born 1985), Russian model, television presenter, singer and actress
- Elena Berlato (born 1988), Italian cyclist
- Elena Berta (born 1992), Italian sailor
- Elena Bertocchi (born 1994), Italian diver
- Elena Besley, British computational chemist and researcher
- Elena Besova (born 1966), Russian judoka
- Elena Bianchini-Cappelli (1873–1919), Italian opera singer
- Elena Bibescu (1855–1902), Romanian noblewoman and pianist
- Elena Bineva (born 1999), Bulgarian group rhythmic gymnast
- Elena Bissolati (born 1997), Italian cyclist
- Elena Blasco, Spanish multidisciplinary artist
- Elena Bobrovskaya (born 1975), Kyrgyzstani athlete
- Elena Bodnarenco (1965–2022), Moldovan politician
- Elena Boeva (born 1985), Bulgarian model and actress
- Elena Bogdan (born 1992), Romanian tennis player
- Elena Boldyreva (born 1961), Russian chemist
- Elena Boledovičová (born 1953), Slovak handball player
- Elena Bolotina (born 1997), Belarusian rhythmic gymnast
- Elena Bomeshko (born 1950), Transnistrian politician
- Elena Bondar (born 1958), Romanian rower
- Elena Bonetti (born 1974), Italian politician
- Elena Maria Bonfanti (born 1988), Italian sprinter
- Elena Borghi (born 2002), Italian canoeist
- Elena Borstein (born 1946), American artist
- Elena Botchorichvili, Georgian-Canadian writer
- Infanta Elena, Duchess of Lugo, (born 1963), Infanta of Spain and Duchess of Lugo
- Elena Bouryka (born 1983), Russian-Italian actress
- Elena Bovina (born 1983), Russian tennis player
- Elena Božić Talijan (born 1970), Serbian politician
- Elena Brambilla (1942–2018), Italian historian
- Elena Braslavsky, American pianist of Russian descent
- Elena Braverman (born 1961), Russian, Israeli, and Canadian mathematician
- Elena Brejniva (born 1990), Russian cyclist
- Elena Brezányiová (born 1958), Slovak handball player
- Elena Brioukhovets (born 1971), Soviet-Ukrainian tennis player
- Elena Brockmann (1867–1946), Spanish artist
- Elena Brugger (born 1997), German freestyle wrestler
- Elena Buglova, IAEA administrator
- Elena Bukreeva (born 1965), Soviet gymnast
- Elena Bulgakova (1893–1970), Soviet author and intellectual
- Elena Bunina (born 1976), Russian mathematician
- Elena Burkard (born 1992), German long-distance runner
- Elena Burke (1928–2002), Cuban singer
- Elena Busso (born 1976), Italian volleyball player
- Elena Butnaru (born 1975), Romanian volleyball player
- Elena Karina Byrne, American poet
- Elena Caffarena (1903–2003), Chilean lawyer, jurist and politician
- Elena Gatti Caporaso (1918–1999), Italian politician
- Elena Caragiani-Stoenescu (1887–1929), Romanian aviator
- Elena Carapetis (born 1970), Greek-Australian actress
- Elena Carraro (born 2001), Italian hurdler
- Elena Carrión (born 1970), Spanish field hockey player
- Elena Carter Richardson (1948–2006), American ballerina and dance instructor
- Elena Cassin (1909–2011), Italian oriental scholar
- Elena Catena (1920–2012), Spanish academic
- Elena Cattaneo (born 1962), Italian academic
- Elena Cazzulani (1920–2007), Italian writer and poet
- Elena Ceampelea (born 1947), Romanian artistic gymnast
- Elena Ceaușescu (1916–1989), wife of former Romanian head of state Nicolae Ceaușescu
- Elena Cecchini (born 1992), Italian cyclist
- Elena Celledoni (born 1967), Italian mathematician
- Elena Cernei (1924–2000), Romanian opera singer
- Elena Chalova (born 1987), Russian tennis player
- Elena Chebanu (born 1981), Ukrainian-Azerbaijani Paralympic sprinter
- Elena Chernenko, multiple people
- Elena Chiozza (1919–2011), Argentine geographer
- Elena Chistilina (born 1982), Russian Paralympic athlete
- Elena Chizhova, Russian translator and writer
- Elena Chudinova (born 1959), Russian writer
- Elena Colas (born 2010), French artistic gymnast
- Elena Congost (born 1987), Spanish Paralympic athlete
- Elena Conis (born 1974), American historian of medicine
- Elena Constantinescu (1925–2005), British nightclub owner and spy
- Elena Conterno (born 1969), Peruvian economist and politician
- Elena Conti (born 1967), Italian biochemist
- Elena Corregido (born 1956), Argentine politician
- Elena-Luminița Cosma (born 1972), Romanian chess player
- Elena Cotta (born 1931), Italian actress
- Elena Cuoco, Italian astrophysicist and professor
- Elena Curtoni (born 1991), Italian alpine skier
- Elena Cuza (1825–1909), Romanian noble and philanthropist
- Elena D'Amario (born 1990), Italian dancer and choreographer
- Elena D'Angri (1824–1886), Greek opera singer
- Elena Dabija, Moldovan librarian and activist
- Elena Dache (born 1997), Romanian handball player
- Elena Dami (born 1999), Italian curler
- Elena Damiani (born 1979), Peruvian visual artist
- Elena Dan, Romanian opera singer
- Elena Danilova (born 1987), Russian footballer
- Elena Darikovich, Russian photographer
- Elena Abramovna Davidovich (1922–2013), Russian archaeologist and numismatist
- Elena D'Elia (born 2005), Italian singer-songwriter
- Elena Delle Donne (born 1989), American basketball player
- Elena Dementieva (born 1981), Russian former tennis player
- Elena Denchtchik (born 1973), Russian footballer
- Elena Denisova (born 1963), Austrian violinist
- Elena Desderi (born 1967), Italian cross-country skier
- Elena Deza (born 1961), Russian mathematician
- Elena Dhont (born 1998), Belgian footballer
- Elena Di Cioccio (born 1974), Italian actress
- Elena Di Girolamo, Argentine politician
- Elena Di Liddo (born 1993), Italian swimmer
- Elena Dimitrakopoulou (born 1977), Greek sailor
- Elena Dobrițoiu (born 1957), Romanian rower
- Elena Dobronravova (1932–1999), Russian actress
- Elena Dolgopolova (born 1980), Russian gymnast
- Elena Donaldson-Akhmilovskaya (1957–2012), Soviet-born American chess player
- Elena Donati (born 1974), Italian swimmer
- Elena Donazzan (born 1972), Italian politician
- Elena Dorfman, American fine art photographer
- Elena Doronina (born 1981), Russian bobsledder
- Elena Dostatni (born 1983), Russian ice dancer
- Elena Dostay (born 1969), Russian archer
- Elena J. Duarte, American lawyer
- Elena Duggan (born 1983), Australian cook
- Elena Duglioli (c. 1472–1520), Italian Roman Catholic aristocrat
- Elena Durán (born 1949), American flautist
- Elena Dzamashvili (1942–2020), Georgian pianist
- Elena Elagina (1949–2022), Russian artist
- Elena Elfimova (born 1972), Russian volleyball player
- Elena Eliseenko (born 1959), Soviet tennis player
- Elena Engel, American film producer
- Elena Epuran (born 1931), Romanian alpine skier
- Elena Erbakova, Russian actress
- Elena Eremina (born 2001), Russian artistic gymnast
- Elena Erighina (born 1996), Moldovan weightlifter
- Elena Erosheva, Russian statistician and social scientist
- Elena Eskina (born 1976), retired Russian field hockey player and umpire
- Elena Espinosa (born 1960), Spanish politician
- Elena Esposito (born 1960), Italian sociologist
- Elena Evseeva (born 1982), Russian ballerina
- Elena Ezhova (born 1977), Russian volleyball player
- Elena Fabrizi (1915–1993), Italian actress
- Elena Fanailova (born 1962), Russian poet
- Elena Fanchini (1985–2023), Italian alpine skier
- Elena Farago (1878–1954), Romanian poet, translator and children's author
- Elena Fatalibekova (born 1947), Russian chess player
- Elena Fattori (born 1966), Italian politician from Rimini
- Elena Favilli (born 1982), Italian author and entrepreneur
- Elena Aída Fernicola, Argentine politician
- Elena Fernández (born 1956), Spanish operations researcher
- Elena Ferrante (active 1992–present), pseudonymous Italian novelist
- Elena Ferrari, Italian computer scientist
- Elena Ferretti, Italian singer
- Elena Fidatov (born 1960), Romanian runner
- Elena Filipovska, Macedonian philologist, teacher and writer
- Elena Filonova, French classical pianist
- Elena Fiore (1914–1983), Italian actress
- Elena Firsova (born 1950), Russian composer
- Elena Florica (born 1992), Romanian handball player
- Elena Fomicheva (born 1987), Russian musician
- Elena Fomina (born 1979), Russian footballer
- Elena Fonseca (1930–2024), Uruguayan activist and radio journalist
- Elena Forbes, English writer
- Elena Ford (born 1966), American businesswoman
- Elena Fortún (1886–1952), Spanish author
- Elena Franchi (born 1996), Italian cyclist
- Elena Freda (1890–1978), Italian mathematician and mathematical physicist
- Elena Frías de Chávez (born 1935), mother of late Venezuelan president Hugo Chávez, Aníbal José Chávez Frías, Adán Chávez and granddaughter of Pedro Pérez Delgado
- Elena Frolova (born 1969), Russian-Latvian singer
- Elena Frumosu (born 1968), Moldovan politician
- Elena Fuentes-Afflick, American pediatrician
- Elena Furiase (born 1988), Spanish actress
- Elena Gadel (born 1982), Spanish singer
- Elena Gaja (born 1946), Romanian mezzo-soprano opera singer
- Elena de Galantha (1890–1986), American histologist
- Elena Galiabovitch (born 1989), Australian sport shooter
- Elena Galoppini, Italian chemist
- Elena Garanina (born 1956), Soviet ice dancer
- Elena García Armada (born 1971), Spanish engineer
- Elena Garro (1916–1998), Mexican writer
- Elena Gaskell (born 2001), Canadian freestyle skier
- Eléna Gee (born 1949), New Zealand jeweller
- Elena Gemo (born 1987), Italian swimmer
- Elena Georgescu (born 1964), Romanian rower
- Elena Georgieva (1930–2007), Bulgarian linguist
- Elena Georgieva (gymnast) (born 1947), Bulgarian gymnast
- Elena Georgievskaya (born 1980), Russian author and politician
- Elena Gerasimova (born 2004), Russian artistic gymnast
- Elena Gerhardt (1883–1961), German opera singer
- Elena Gheorghe (born 1985), Romanian singer; known for her hits "The Balkan Girls" and "Disco Romancing"
- Elena Gianini Belotti (1929–2022), Italian writer, teacher and activist
- Elena Gibson (born 1976), English dancer
- Elena Gigli (born 1985), Italian water polo player
- Elena Gilels (1948–1996), Russian pianist
- Elena Ginko (born 1976), Belarusian race walker
- Elena Giurcă (1946–2013), Romanian rower
- Elena Gjeorgjievska (born 1990), Macedonian handball player
- Elena Glinskaya, grand princess of Moscow
- Elena Glurjidze, Georgian ballet dancer
- Elena Gnesina (1874–1967), Russian composer and teacher
- Elena Gogoleva (1900–1993), Soviet and Russian actress
- Elena Goh Ling Yin (born 1996), Malaysian race walker
- Elena Golovina (born 1961), Russian biathlete
- Elena Gómez (born 1985), Spanish gymnast
- Elena González-Moñux, Spanish politician
- Elena Goode (born 1983), American actress
- Elena Gorohova (born 1972), Moldovan biathlete
- Elena Gorokhova (1933–2014), Russian painter
- Elena Gorokhova (writer) (born 1955), Russian writer
- Elena Gorolová (born 1969), Czech human rights defender
- Elena Gorlova (born 1981), Russian Paralympic athlete
- Ellie Goulding (born 1986), British singer-songwriter, born Elena Jane Goulding
- Elena Gremina (1956–2018), Russian writer and playwright
- Elena Grigorenko (born 1965), American clinical psychologist
- Elena Grigoryants (born 1965), Russian culturologist
- Elena de' Grimani (born 1975), Italian comics illustrator
- Elena Grinenko, Russian dancer
- Elena Grölz (1960–2025), Romanian-born German handball player
- Elena Grosheva (born 1979), Russian artistic gymnast
- Elena Grushina (born 1975), Ukrainian figure skater
- Elena Guerra (1835–1914), Italian catholic religious sister
- Elena Guerra (born 1976), Uruguayan middle-distance runner
- Elena Guro (1877–1913), Russian writer, illustrator and painter
- Elena Guseva, Russian operatic soprano
- Elena Guskova (born 1949), Russian historian
- Elena Hartmann (born 1990), Swiss cyclist
- Elena Hassinger, German physicist
- Elena Hauer (born 1986), German footballer
- Elena Herraiz (born 1992), Spanish linguist and YouTube personality
- Elena Herzenberg (born 1979), German high jumper
- Elena Hight (born 1989), American snowboarder
- Elena Highton de Nolasco (born 1942), Argentine judge
- Elena Hila (born 1974), Romanian shot putter
- Elena Holmberg (1931–1978), Argentine diplomat
- Elena Horvat (born 1958), Romanian rower
- Elena Hrenova (1950–2020), Russian-Moldovan politician
- Elena Hristova (born 2011), Bulgarian rhythmic gymnast
- Elena Huelva (2002–2023), Spanish cancer activist and writer
- Elena Huerta Muzquiz (1908–1997), Mexican artist
- Elena Ierodiakonou (born 1982), Cypriot model
- Elena Ilinykh (born 1994), Russian ice dancer
- Elena Ionescu (born 1988), Romanian singer
- Elena Irureta (born 1955), Spanish actress
- Elena Ivanova, several people
- Elena Ivashchenko (1984–2013), Russian judoka
- Elena Izcue (1889–1970), Peruvian illustrator, graphic artist
- Elena Jacinto (born 1985), Spanish wheelchair tennis player
- Elena Jahn (1938–2014), American painter
- Elena Janulaitienė (1893–1982), Lithuanian painter
- Elena Jikhareva (born 1974), Russian footballer
- Elena Johnson (born 1985), Guernsey badminton player
- Elena Julve (born 2000), Spanish footballer
- Elena Jurado (1901–1974), Filipino-American actress
- Elena Juricich (born 1979), Uruguayan tennis player
- Elena Kagan (born 1960), former United States Solicitor General and current Associate Justice of the Supreme Court of the United States
- Elena Kalinina (born 1997), Russian kitesurfer
- Elena Kaliská (born 1972), Slovak slalom canoeist
- Elena Kamburova (born 1940), Russian singer and actress
- Elena Kampouris (born 1997), American actress
- Elena Karaman Karić (born 1971), Serbian interior designer
- Elena Karpova (born 1980), Russian basketball player
- Elena Karpukhina (born 1951), Soviet rhythmic gymnast
- Elena Karpushenko (1961–2024), Russian rhythmic gymnast
- Elena Kats-Chernin (born 1957), Australian composer
- Elena Kazan, German-Russian actress
- Elena Kazantseva (born 1956), Belarusian poet and singer
- Elena Kazimirtchak-Polonskaïa (1902–1992), Ukrainian astronomer
- Elena Keldibekova (born 1974), Kazakhstani-Peruvian volleyball player
- Elena Kelety (born 1999), German hurdler
- Elena Khatzisavva (born 1977), Cypriot gymnast
- Elena Khusyaynova, Russian accountant
- Elena Kirillova (born 1986), Russian basketball player
- Elena Kitić (born 1997), Serbian singer-songwriter
- Elena Kliachkina (born 2005), Russian para swimmer
- Elena Nikandrovna Klokacheva (1871–19??), Russian artist
- Elena Kochneva (born 1989), Russian footballer
- Elena Koleva (born 1977), Bulgarian volleyball player
- Elena Kolomina (born 1981), Kazakhstani cross-country skier
- Elena Komendrovskaja (born 1991), Russian badminton player
- Elena Kong (born 1971), Hong Kong actress, radio DJ and television host
- Elena Konstantinova (born 1981), Russian volleyball player
- Elena Könz (born 1987), Swiss snowboarder
- Elena Köpke (born 1984), German chess player
- Elena Korikova (born 1972), Russian theater and television actress
- Elena Korosteleva (born 1972), Belarusian political scientist
- Elena Koshka (born 1993), Russian-American adult fiction writer
- Elena Kosmina (born 1995), Ukrainian beauty queen and model
- Elena Kössler (born 1999), Austrian footballer
- Elena Kostenko (1926–2019), Russian artist
- Elena Kostyuchenko (born 1987), Russian journalist
- Elena Kotulskaya (born 1988), Russian middle-distance runner
- Elena Kountoura (born 1962), Greek ex-model and politician
- Elena Kratter (born 1996), Swiss para-athlete
- Elena Kriegner (born 1968), Austrian jewelry designer
- Elena Krishtof (1925–2001), Soviet Russian writer, and educator
- Elena Krivonosova (born 1972), Ukrainian volleyball player
- Elena Kruchinkina (born 1995), Belarusian biathlete
- Elena Krutova (born 1980), Russian Paralympic archer
- Elena Krykanova, Soviet figure skater
- Elena Kubiliūnaitė (1900–1997), Lithuanian athletics competitor
- Elena Kucharik (born 1942), American artist
- Elena Kuchinskaya (born 1984), Russian cyclist
- Elena Kulichenko (born 2002), Cypriot athlete
- Elena Kunova (born 1975), Bulgarian volleyball player
- Elena Kurbakova (born 1982), Israeli snooker and pool player
- Elena Kuschnerova (born 1959), Russian-born pianist
- Elena Kustarova (born 1976), Russian ice dancer and coach
- Elena Kutorgienė (1888–1963), Lithuanian physician
- Elena Efimovna Kuzmina (1931–2013), Russian archaeologist
- Elena Kuznetsova (born 1982), Uzbekistani sport shooter
- Elena Kviatkovskaya (born 1965), Uzbekistani sprinter

==== L–Z ====
- Elena Lacková (1921–2003), Slovak poet and writer
- Elena Lagadinova (1930–2017), Bulgarian agronomist, genetic engineer and politician
- Elena Lagorara (1939–2003), Italian gymnast
- Elena Landázuri (1888–1970), Mexican musician and activist
- Elena Lander (born 1985), Russian actress and television presenter
- Elena Langer, Russian composer
- Elena Lasconi (born 1972), Romanian politician
- Elena Lashmanova (born 1992), Russian race walker
- Elena Laumenskienė (1880–1960), Lithuanian composer and educator
- Elena Ledda (born 1959), Sardinian singer
- Elena Leeve (born 1983), Finnish actress
- Elena Lengwiler (born 1996), Swiss ice hockey player and nominated kitefoiler
- Elena Leonova (born 1973), Russian pair skater
- Elena Letuchaya (born 1978), Russian television presenter
- Elena Leușteanu (1935–2008), Romanian artistic gymnast
- Elena Liashenko (born 1976), Ukrainian figure skater
- Elena Libera (1917–2012), Italian fencer
- Elena Likhovtseva (born 1975), Russian tennis player
- Elena Lilik (born 1998), German canoeist
- Elena Linari (born 1994), Italian footballer
- Elena Lipalit (born 1936), Romanian canoeist
- Elena Lissacheva (born 1973), Russian footballer
- Elena Litchman, professor of aquatic ecology
- Elena Livrinikj (born 1994), Macedonian handball player
- Elena Lizzi (born 1967), Italian politician
- Elena Lobsanova, Russian-Canadian ballet dancer
- Elena Loewenthal (born 1960), Italian historian and translator
- Elena Logofătu (born 1997), Romanian rower
- Elena Lohner (born 2001), Liechtensteiner footballer
- Elena Lomakin, Russian-American painter
- Elena Long, American physicist and activist
- Elena López (born 1994), Spanish rhythmic gymnast
- Elena Loyo (born 1983), Spanish long-distance runner
- Elena Lucchinelli (born 2001), Italian cyclist
- Elena Lucchini (born 1984), Italian politician
- Elena Lucena (1914–2015), Argentine actress
- Elena Lukauskienė (1909–1959), Lithuanian chess player
- Elena Luksch-Makowsky (1878–1967), Russian painter
- Elena Lunda (1901–1941), Italian actress
- Elena Luzzatto (1900–1983), Italian architect
- Elena Lyadova (born 1980), Russian actress
- Elena Macovei (born 1963), Romanian sports shooter
- Elena Maganini, American film editor
- Elena Makarova (born 1973), Russian tennis player
- Elena Makhnev, Mexican musician
- Elena Maksimova (born 1988), Belarusian chess player
- Elena Makushkina, Russian rower
- Elena Malõgina (born 2000), Estonian tennis player
- Elena Mandalis, Australian actress
- Elena Manferdini (born 1974), Italian architect
- Elena Manistina (born 1973), Russian operatic mezzo-soprano
- Elena Mantovan, mathematician
- Elena Manuele (born 2003), Italian singer
- Elena Marchisotto, American mathematician
- Elena Mărgărit (born 1936), Romanian artistic gymnast
- Elena Marinucci (1928–2023), Italian politician
- Elena Vladimirovna Markova (1923–2023), Soviet-Russian cyberneticist
- Elena Maróthy-Šoltésová (1855–1939), Slovak writer and editor
- Elena Maroulleti, Greek Cypriot American independent journalist/reporter and founder of AKTINA FM
- Elena Martín, Spanish actress and filmmaker
- Elena Martinez Fontes (1915–1989), Argentine marine biologist
- Elena Martínez Rosso, Uruguayan lawyer and judge
- Elena Marttila (1923–2022), Russian painter
- Elena Mathis (born 1999), Swiss-Italian curler
- Elena Matous (born 1953), Italian alpine skier
- Elena Mauti Nunziata (1946–2024), Italian opera singer
- Elena Mazzantini (born 1874, date of death unknown), Italian actress known as Daisy Sylvan
- Elena Medel (born 1985), Spanish poet
- Elena Mederos (1900–1981), Cuban activist, feminist and social reformer
- Elena Medved (born 1985), Russian footballer
- Elena Meissner, Romanian feminist and suffragist
- Elena Melián (born 2001), Spanish synchronized swimmer
- Elena Melnik (born 1986), Russian fashion model
- Elena Mestergazi (born 1967), Russian academic
- Elena Meuti (born 1983), Italian high jumper
- Elena Micheli (born 1999), Italian modern pentathlete
- Elena Micic (born 2004), Australian tennis player
- Elena Micozzi (born 2003), Italian canoeist
- Elena Mikhaylichenko (born 2001), Russian handball player
- Elena Mikhnenko (1922–1993), Ukrainian exile
- Elena Milashina (born 1977), Russian journalist
- Elena Miller, Soviet spy
- Elena Milovanović (born 2001), Serbian tennis player
- Elena Miramova (1901–1992), American actress and playwright
- Elena Moldovan Popoviciu (1924–2009), Romanian mathematician
- Elena Moosmann (born 2002), Swiss professional golfer
- Elena Moreno (1892–1974), Chilean actress
- Elena Moretti (born 1987), Italian judoka
- Elena Puw Morgan, Welsh novelist and children's writer
- Elena Morozova (born 1987), Russian footballer
- Elena Moskaleva (born 1957), Russian painter
- Elena Moskalová-Poláková (born 1948), Czech volleyball player
- Elena Moșuc (born 1964), Romanian operatic soprano
- Elena Motta (born 2000), Guatemalan politician
- Elena Mousikou (born 1988), Cypriot archer
- Elena Mrozovskaya (c. 1861–c. 1941), Russian photographer
- Elena Mukhina (1960–2006), Soviet gymnast
- Elena Murariu (born 1963), Romanian painter and iconographer
- Elena Muratova (skier) (born 1986), Russian freestyle skier
- Elena Murgoci (1960–1999), Romanian long-distance runner
- Elena Murzina (born 1984), Russian rhythmic gymnast
- Elena Myers (born 1993), American motorcycle racer
- Elena Napăr (born 1977), Romanian handball player
- Elena Naperotić (born 2001), Croatian singer-songwriter
- Elena Alexandrovna Naryshkina (1785–1855), Russian noblewoman
- Elena Näsänen (born 1968), Finnish visual artist
- Elena Năsturel, Romanian princess consort
- Elena Nathanael (1947–2008), Greek actress
- Elena Naumoska (born 1994), Macedonian footballer
- Elena Nefedova (born 1974), Russian rhythmic gymnast
- Elena Negreanu (1918–2016), Romanian actress
- Elena Neill (born 1997), Irish sportswoman
- Elena Neklyudova (born 1973), Russian singer
- Elena Nevado (born 1967), Spanish politician and MEP
- Elena Nikitina (born 1992), Russian skeleton racer
- Elena Nikolaeva, several people
- Elena Nikolaidi (1906–2002), Greek-American opera singer
- Elena Nikoli (born 1982), Greek handball player
- Elena Nikonova, Russian pair skater
- Elena Nobili (1833–1900), Italian painter
- Elena Novelli, Italian social scientist
- Elena Novikova (born 1984), woman endurance cyclist
- Elena Nozdran (born 1975), Ukrainian badminton player
- Elena Nurgalieva (born 1976), Russian ultramarathon runner
- Elena Obono (born 1999), Equatoguinean footballer
- Elena Obraztsova (1930–2015), Russian operatic mezzo-soprano
- Elena Ochoa Foster (born 1958), Spanish publisher and art curator
- Elena Oetling (born 1993), Mexican sailor
- Elena Oprea (born 1953), Romanian rower
- Elena Oriabinskaia (born 1994), Serbian rower
- Elena Orlando (born 1992), American ice hockey player
- Elena Osipova, several people
- Elena Osokina (born 1959), Russian historian
- Elena Ospitaletche (born 1960), Uruguayan swimmer
- Elena Oznobkina (1959–2010), Russian philosopher and human rights activist
- Elena Ornella Paciotti (born 1941), Italian politician
- Elena Padilla (1925–2012), Puerto Rican anthropologist
- Elena María del Rocio Padrones Nieto (born 1973), Spanish cyclist
- Elena Pampoulova (born 1972), Bulgarian tennis player
- Elena Adelina Panaet (born 1993), Romanian long-distance and steeplechase runner
- Elena Panaritis (born 1968), Greek economist
- Elena Paneska (born 2002), Macedonian footballer
- Elena Paparazzo (born 1973), Italian basketball player
- Elena Paparizou (born 1982), Greek singer
- Elena Parent (born 1975), American politician
- Elena Partac (born 1984), Moldovan chess player
- Elena Passarello, American writer, actor and professor
- Elena Patron (1933–2021), Filipina writer
- Elena Paunero Ruiz (1906–2009), Spanish botanist
- Elena Pautova (born 1986), Russian Paralympic athlete
- Elena Pavel (born 1984), Romanian footballer
- Elena Perepelkina (born 1982), Russian freestyle wrestler
- Elena Perova (born 1976), Russian singer
- Elena Petreska (born 1980), Macedonian pop singer
- Elena Maria Petrini (born 1992), Italian triathlete
- Princess Elena of Montenegro (Princess Elena Petrović-Njegoš of Montenegro, 1873–1952), wife of King Victor Emmanuel III of Italy
- Elena Philipieva (born 1970), Ukrainian prima ballerina
- Elena Pietrini (born 2000), Italian volleyball player
- Elena Pinderhughes (born 1995), American jazz flutist
- Elena Pingacheva (born 1981), Russian figure skater
- Elena Piron (born 1960), Romanian volleyball player
- Elena Pirozhkova (born 1986), American sport wrestler
- Elena Pirrone (born 1999), Italian cyclist
- Elena Pisareva (born 1967), Russian politician
- Elena Cornaro Piscopia (1646–1684), Venetian philosopher
- Elena Piskun (born 1978), Belarusian artistic gymnast
- Elena V. Pitjeva, Russian astronomer
- Elena Plante, speech language pathologist
- Elena Plastinina (born 1963), Ukrainian athlete
- Elena Podzámska (born 1972), Slovak actress
- Elena Pogrebizhskaya (born 1972), Russian journalist, director and screenwriter
- Elena Polyakova (born 1981), Russian ultramarathon runner
- Elena Poniatowska (born 1932), Mexican journalist and author
- Elena Pontiggia (born 1955), Italian art critic
- Elena Pop-Hossu-Longin (1862–1940), Hungarian-born Romanian writer and activist
- Elena Popa (born 1976), Romanian rower
- Elena Popescu (born 1989), Moldovan middle-distance runner
- Elena Moldovan Popoviciu (1924–2009), Romanian mathematician
- Elena Popovska (born 1990), Macedonian swimmer
- Elena Poptodorova (born 1951), Bulgarian politician and diplomat
- Elena Porosniuc (born 1987), Moldovan footballer
- Elena Postică (born 1954), Moldovan historian
- Elena Presser (born 1940), Argentine artist
- Elena Pridankina (born 2005), Russian tennis player
- Elena Prieto-Rodriguez, Spanish-Australian mathematician
- Elena Proklova (born 1953), Soviet-Russian actress
- Elena Prokofeva (born 1971), Russian para table tennis player
- Elena Prokofyeva (born 1994), Russian synchronized swimmer
- Elena Proskurakova (born 1985), Kyrgyzstani judoka
- Elena Prosteva (born 1990), Russian alpine skier
- Elena Prus (born 1986), Ukrainian badminton player
- Elena Prushakevich, Russian populist and revolutionary
- Elena Queirolo, Uruguayan toxicology researcher
- Elena Quinteros (1945–1976), Uruguayan anarchist and school teacher
- Elena Quirici (born 1994), Swiss karateka
- Elena Quiroga (1921–1995), Spanish writer
- Elena Radionova (born 1999), Russian figure skater
- Elena Radonicich (born 1985), Italian actress
- Elena Radu (born 1975), Romanian canoeist
- Elena Raffalovich (1842–1918), Russian educator
- Elena Ralph (born 1983), Israeli model and beauty pageant titleholder
- Elena Ramírez Parra, Spanish scientist and molecular biologist
- Elena Ecaterina Rareș, Moldavian princess consort
- Elena Rastello (born 1958), Italian middle-distance runner
- Elena Recco (c. 1654–1700s), Italian still-life painter
- Elena Rede (born 1967), Italian sculptor
- Elena Reiche (born 1979), German modern pentathlete
- Elena Reid (born 1981), American martial artist
- Elena Remizova (born 1986), Russian Paralympic skier
- Elena Reygadas (born 1976), Mexican chef
- Elena Reynaga, Argentinian activist
- Elena Sofia Ricci (born 1962), Italian actress
- Elena Richter (born 1989), German archer
- Elena Rigas (born 1996), Danish speed skater
- Elena Rios, American physician and public health advocate
- Elena Risteska (born 1986), Macedonian singer and songwriter
- Elena Rivera, several people
- Elena del Rivero, Spanish artist
- Elena Rodriguez-Falcon, Mexican academic and engineer
- Elena Roger (born 1974), Argentine actress
- Elena Romanovna, Russian princess
- Elena Romanovskaya (born 1984), Russian ice dancer
- Elena de Roo, New Zealand author and poet
- Elena Roos (born 1991), Swiss orienteer
- Elena Rose (born 1995), Venezuelan-American singer
- Elena Rosell (born 1986), Spanish motorcycle racer
- Elena Rossini, Italian filmmaker, writer and artist
- Elena Rostropovich (born 1958), Russian pianist
- Elena Rozmirovich (1886–1953), Russian politician
- Elena Ruehr, American musician, music educator and composer
- Elena Ruiz (born 2004), Spanish water polo player
- Elena Runggaldier (born 1990), Italian skier
- Elena Russo (born 1972), Italian actress
- Elena Rybakina (born 1999), Russian-Kazakhstani tennis player
- Elena Rybkina (born 1964), Russian badminton player
- Elena Rzhevskaya (1919–2017), Soviet war interpreter
- Elena Săcălici (1935–1959), Romanian artistic gymnast
- Elena Sadiku (born 1993), Swedish football player and coach
- Elena Sainz (born 2001), Mexican footballer
- Elena Salgado (born 1949), Spanish politician
- Elena Salvador (born 1979), Spanish tennis player
- Elena Samokysh-Sudkovskaya (1863–1924), Russian painter
- Elena Sanayeva (born 1942), Soviet and Russian actress
- Elena Sánchez, several people
- Elena Sancho (born 1989), Spanish politician
- Elena Sangro (1897–1969), Italian actress
- Elena Santarelli (born 1981), Italian model, television personality and actress
- Elena Santiago (1936–2021), Spanish author
- Elena Santoni (1930–2022), Italian gymnast
- Elena Santonja (1932–2016), Spanish television presenter and actress
- Elena Gracinda Santos (born 1997), American soccer player
- Elena Sanz (1844–1898), Spanish opera singer
- Elena Satine (born 1987), Georgian-American actress and singer
- Elena Saurel, London-based Spanish-American actress
- Elena Savelyeva (born 1984), Russian boxer
- Elena Savoldi (born 1972), Italian tennis player
- Elena Sazhina (born 1994), Russian TV host, vlogger and actress
- Elena Sazonenkova (born 1973), Soviet artistic gymnast
- Elena Scarpellini (born 1987), Italian pole vaulter
- Elena Schegaleva (born 1987), Russian footballer
- Elena Schiavo (born 1948), Italian footballer
- Elena Scott (born 2003), American volleyball player
- Elena Sedina (born 1968), Ukrainian-Italian chess player
- Elena Seifert (born 1973), Kazakh-Russian poet, translator, literary critic, and journalist
- Elena Seiple (born 1973), American bodybuilder
- Elena Semechin (born 1993), German Paralympic swimmer
- Elena Semikina (born 1983), Russian-Canadian actress
- Elena Semino (born 1964), British linguist
- Elena Sever (born 1973), Russian singer
- Elena Shaddow, American singer and actress
- Elena Shadrina (born 1982), Russian weightlifter
- Elena Shcheglova (born 1950), Russian figure skater
- Elena Sheynina (born 1965), Ukrainian children's writer
- Elena Shimko (born 1982), Russian badminton player
- Elena Shinohara (born 2000), American rhythmic gymnast
- Elena Shirman (1908–1942), Russian-Jewish poet
- Elena Shportun-Willemer (born 1976), Russian bodybuilder
- Elena Shtaerman (1914–1991), Soviet academic
- Elena Shumilova (born 1978), Russian politician
- Elena Shumskaya, Ukrainian rhythmic gymnast
- Elena Shvarts (1948–2010), Russian meta-realist poet
- Elena Sidneva (born 1964), Russian dressage rider
- Elena Siegman, American singer
- Elena Simperl (born 1978), computer scientist
- Elena Sisto, American painter based in New York
- Elena Skochilo (born 1980), Kyrgyzstani journalist
- Elena Skordelli (born 1968), Cypriot television presenter
- Elena Skuin (1908–1986), Russian artist
- Elena Smolyanova (born 1986), Uzbekistani shot putter
- Elena Smurova (born 1974), Russian water polo player
- Elena Sokhryakova (born 1990), Russian speed skater
- Elena Sokolova, several people
- Elena Solovey (born 1947), Soviet-Russian actress
- Elena Sordelli (born 1976), Italian sprinter
- Elena Sorokina, writer, curator and art historian
- Elena Sorolla (1895–1975), Spanish painter
- Elena Sotgiu (born 1995), Belgian field hockey player
- Elena Souliotis (1943–2004), Greek opera singer
- Elena Spirgevičiūtė (1924–1944), Lithuanian martyr and Servant of God
- Elena Stan (born 1958), Romanian luger
- Elena Stasova (1873–1966), Russian communist revolutionary
- Elena Stejko, Ukrainian-born New Zealand actress and theatre director
- Elena Stern (born 1994), Swiss curler
- Elena Stikhina (born 1986), Russian operatic soprano
- Elena Stonaker (born 1985), American fine artist and designer
- Elena Stoyanova (born 1952), Bulgarian shot putter
- Elena Subirats (1947–2018), Mexican tennis player
- Elena Surgutskaya (born 1986), Russian dancer and choreographer
- Elena Suslova (born 1984), Russian footballer
- Elena Sviridova (born 1988), Russian Paralympic athlete
- Elena Tagliabue (born 1977), Italian alpine skier
- Elena Tairova (1991–2010), Belarusian-Russian chess player
- Elena Andreea Taloș (born 1995), Romanian triple jumper
- Elena Tărîță (born 1954), Romanian sprinter
- Elena Tarrats (born 1993), Spanish actress
- Elena Tatarkova (born 1976), Ukrainian former tennis player
- Elena Tchalykh (born 1974), Russian cyclist
- Elena Tedesco (born 1991), Salvadoran beauty pageant titleholder
- Elena Tejada-Herrera, Peruvian-American artist
- Elena María Tejeiro (born 1939), Spanish actress
- Elena Temnikova (born 1985), Russian singer, television personality and fashion designer
- Elena Teplitskaya (1916–c. 1998), Ukrainian psychologist
- Elena Terekhova (born 1987), Russian footballer
- Elena Tereshina (born 1959), Soviet rower
- Elena Terlevich, Argentine astrophysicist
- Elena Tikhonova (born 1977), Austrian film director
- Elena Timina (born 1969), Russian-Dutch table tennis player
- Elena Tkach (born 1970), Russian sports shooter
- Elena Tkachenko (born 1983), Belarusian rhythmic gymnast
- Elena Tobiash, Russian former pair skater
- Elena Todorova (born 1994), Bulgarian rhythmic gymnast
- Elena Tokun (born 1974), Russian water polo player
- Elena Tomas (born 1961), Soviet rhythmic gymnast
- Elena Tomilova (born 1967), Russian volleyball player
- Elena Tonetta (born 1988), Italian archer
- Elena Tonnini (born 1979), Sammarinese politician
- Elena Topuridze (1922–2004), Georgian philosopher
- Elena Tornikidou (born 1965), Uzbekistani-Russian basketball player
- Elena de Toro (born 1997), Spanish footballer
- Elena Torre (born 1973), Italian writer
- Elena Torres (1893–1970), Mexican revolutionary, feminist, progressive educator and writer
- Elena Tovar, Mexican-American actress
- Elena Tsagrinou (born 1994), Greek singer
- Elena Tsallagova, Russian operatic soprano
- Elena Tsavalia (born 1964), Greek actress and presenter
- Elena K. Tsolakis, Australian Greek Cypriot architect
- Elena Tsunaeva (born 1969), Russian politician
- Elena Jane Tucker, Australian geneticist
- Elena Turcan (born 1975), Moldovan footballer
- Elena Udrea (born 1973), Romanian politician; Minister of Tourism
- Elena Urkizu (born 1975), Spanish field hockey player
- Elena Urlaeva (born 1961), Uzbek human rights activist
- Elena Urrutia (1932–2015), Mexican journalist and activist
- Elena Utkina (born 1990), Russian handball player
- Elena Utrobina (born 1985), Russian cyclist
- Elena Văcărescu (1864–1947), Romanian-French writer
- Elena Vaenga (born 1977), Russian singer, songwriter and actress
- Elena Valenciano (born 1960), Spanish politician
- Elena Valentini (born 1992), Italian cyclist
- Elena Vallortigara (born 1991), Italian high jumper
- Elena Valova (born 1963), Russian pair skater
- Elena Vardanyan (born 1984), Armenian actress
- Elena Varzi (1926–2014), Italian film actress
- Elena Vaytsekhovskaya (born 1958), Soviet diver
- Elena Vázquez Cendón, Spanish applied mathematician
- Elena Velevska (born 1980), Macedonian singer
- Elena Velez (born 1994), American fashion designer
- Elena Verdugo (1925–2017), American actress
- Elena Vesna (born 1962), Russian psychologist
- Elena Vesnina (born 1986), Russian tennis player
- Elena Maria Vidal (born 1962), American novelist
- Elena Vintilă (born 1946), Romanian athlete
- Elena Viviani (born 1992), Italian short track speed skater
- Elena Vodorezova (born 1963), Russian figure skater
- Elena Voicu (born 1990), Romanian handball player
- Elena Voronkina (born 1973), Ukrainian volleyball player
- Elena Votsi, Greek designer
- Elena Vukić (born 1991), Croatian volleyball player
- Elena Vukmir (born 2010), Hungarian rhythmic gymnast
- Elena Vystropova (born 1988), Russian-born Azerbaijani boxer
- Elena Wagenmans (born 2000), Dutch squash player
- Elena Waiss (1908–1988), Chilean pianist
- Elena Wassen (born 2000), German diver
- Eléna Wexler-Kreindler (1931–1992), Romanian mathematician
- Elena Whitham (born 1974), British politician
- Elena Xanthoudakis, Australian operatic soprano
- Elena Xausa (1984–2022), Italian illustrator
- Elena Yakovishina (born 1992), Russian alpine skier
- Elena Yakovleva (born 1961), Russian actress
- Elena Yampolskaya (born 1971), Russian theatre critic
- Elena Yanovskaya (born 1938), Soviet-Russian mathematician and economist
- Elena Yaryshka (born 1981), Belarusian tennis player
- Elena Yezhova, Russian opera singer
- Elena Yoncheva (born 1964), Bulgarian journalist
- Elena Yparraguirre (born 1947), Peruvian terrorist
- Elena Zaiatz (born 1969), Russian chess player
- Elena Žalinkevičaitė-Petrauskienė (1900–1986), Lithuanian actress and writer
- Elena Zamolodchikova (born 1982), Russian gymnast
- Elena Zangor (born 1933), Romanian cross-country skier
- Elena Zaremba, Russian-born mezzo-soprano
- Elena Zareschi (1916–1999), Italian stage, television and film actress
- Elena Zdrokova (born 1996), Russian rugby sevens player
- Elena Zelayeta (1898–1974), Mexican-American restaurateur
- Elena Zelenskaya (born 1961), Russian soprano
- Elena Zennaro (born 1943), Italian swimmer
- Elena Zhambalova (1986–2025), Russian poet
- Elena Zharkova (1953–1980), Russian ice dancer
- Elena Zhdanova (born 1980), Russian Paralympic athlete
- Elena Zhosul (born 1980), Russian journalist and television presenter
- Elena Zoubareva (born 1972), Russian soprano
- Elena Zuasti (1935–2011), Uruguayan stage actress

=== Middle name ===
- Maria Elena Camerin (born 1982), Italian tennis player
- Maria Elena Kyriakou (born 1984), Greek Cypriot singer

== In fiction ==
- Elena, from Street Fighter III, Ultra Street Fighter IV, and Street Fighter VI
- Elena, a priestess from Grandia II
- Elena, a lord and the illegitimate daughter of Thomas Covenant
- Elena, an 18-year-old girl from the Wii game Pandora's Tower
- Elena, a Soviet scientist in the Stanley Kubrick film 2001: A Space Odyssey
- Elena, played by Vera Filatova, is a resident of Apollo House and one of Jez's love interests in the British TV series Peep Show
- Elena Alvarez, teenage daughter on the 2017 British TV series One Day at a Time
- Elena Amamiya, a character in Star Twinkle PreCure
- Elena Bothari-Jesek, a childhood friend of Miles' and later a leader of the Dendarii Free Mercenary Fleet from the Vorkosigan Saga
- Elena Cañero-Reed, the main character from the TV show Diary of a Future President
- Elena Castillo Flores, a Disney princess from the animated television series Elena of Avalor
- Elena Chávez, abuela to the titular protagonists from the animated children's series Maya & Miguel
- Elena Fisher, a character in the Uncharted series
- Elena Gilbert, from The Vampire Diaries
- Elena Greco, character in the Neapolitan Novels, a 4-part series by the Italian author Elena Ferrante
- Elena Michaels, in the Women of the Otherworld series
- Elena Potato, from the comic book and animated series Monster Allergy
- Elena Ramos, from Dallas
- Elena Rivera, from the Pixar animated film Coco
- Elena of Turks, from Final Fantasy VII
- Elena Tulaska from the science fiction TV series Black Mirror episode entitled USS Callister, parts 1 and 2
- Elena Tyler, a character portrayed by Tangi Miller on the 1998–2002 Warner Bros. series Felicity
- Elena Montero de la Vega, character from The Mask of Zorro and The Legend of Zorro
- Elena, a character in the episode Boo to a Goose from British TV show Inside No 9

== See also ==
- Elena (disambiguation)
- Lena (name)
