= Fomichyov =

Fomichyov or Fomichev (Russian: Фомичёв or Фомичев) is a Russian masculine surname, its feminine counterpart is Fomichyova or Fomicheva. It may refer to:

- Aleksandr Fomichyov (born 1979), Russian football player
- Alexander Fomichev (born 1979), Russian ice hockey goaltender
- Elena Fomicheva (born 1987), Russian classical pianist, soloist and accompanist
- Ilya Fomichev, Kazakhstani footballer
- Klavdia Fomicheva (1917–1958), Russian aviator
- Konstantin Fomichev (born 1977), Russian sprint canoer
- Mikhail Fomichyov (1911–1987), Tank brigade commander
- Valery Fomichev (born 1988), Belarusian football player
- Vladimir Fomichyov (born 1960), Russian football player
- Vladimir Aleksandrovich Fomichyov (born 1954), Kazakhstani football player
- Vyacheslav Fomichyov (born 1965), Russian politician
