= Osokin =

Osokin (Russian: Осокин, feminine: Osokina, from осока meaning carex) is a Russian masculine surname. It is Latvianized to Osokins. Notable people with the surname include:

- Denis Osokin, Russian footballer
- Elena Osokina (born 1959), Russian historian
- Mikhail Osokin, Russian journalist
- Vladimir Osokin (born 1954), Russian Soviet cyclist
- Zlata Osokina (born 2008), Russian artistic gymnast

== See also ==
- The protagonist of Strange Life of Ivan Osokin, a novel by P. D. Ouspensky
