= Stonaker =

Stonaker may refer to:

- Elena Stonaker (born 1985), American fine artist and designer
- Stonaker Cottage, historic building in New York
