= Elena Sokolova (disambiguation) =

Elena Sokolova (born 1980) is a Russian figure skater.

Elena Sokolova or Yelena Sokolova may also refer to:

- Elena Sokolova (swimmer) (born 1991), Russian Olympic swimmer
- Yelena Sokolova (long jumper) (born 1986), Russian long jumper
- Yelena Sokolova (runner) (born 1979), Russian long-distance runner
- Yelena, or Elena, Teodorovna Sokolova () (née Oizerman), a prominent Russian psychologist and philosopher

== See also ==
- Elena (given name)
- Yelena (name)
