= Elena Ivanova =

Elena or Yelena Ivanova may refer to:

- Elena Ivanova (figure skater) (born 1979), Russian figure skater
- Elena Ivanova (sprinter) (born 1988), Paralympic sprinter
- Elena Ivanova (long jumper) (born 1961), Russian long jumper
- Yelena Ivanova (swimmer) (born 1963), Soviet swimmer
- Yelena Ivanova (diver) (born 1973), Kazakhstani diver
- Elena P. Ivanova (fl. 1990s–2020s), Russian biophysicist
