= Elena Skochilo =

Kyrgyzstani journalist (born 1980)

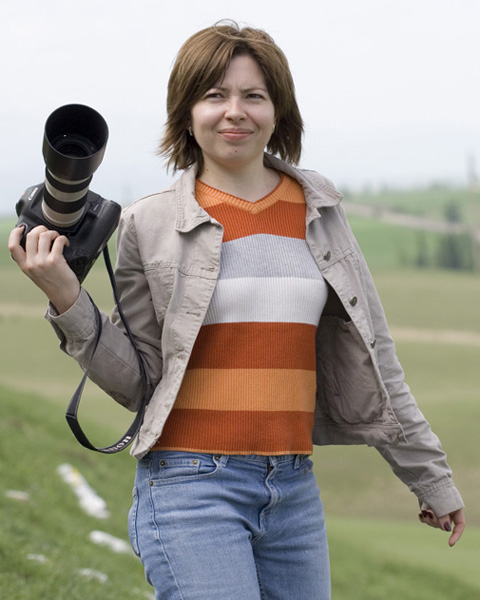
- Skochilo, April 29, 2007.
- Born: November 15, 1980 (age 45); Bishkek, Kyrgyz Republic
- Occupations: Editor, photographer

Elena Skochilo (born November 15, 1980, in Bishkek, Kyrgyzstan), known on the internet by the nickname morrire, is an editor, photographer and blogger from Kyrgyzstan. She is most famous for her award-winning LiveJournal news blog; it was widely cited by bloggers and mass media during Kyrgyzstan's Tulip Revolution in 2005 when she posted news and her own photographs of civil disorder in Bishkek.

Skochilo is a current contributor to news articles and photography for NewEurasia, a news and information project for Central Asia and the Caucasus region. Skochilo is former editor of News Briefing Central Asia, a regional news project of the Institute for War and Peace Reporting. She regularly contributes photography to the Associated Press, Lenta.ru, and EurasiaNet.

Currently, Skochilo is an instructor for the Journalism and Mass Communication department at the American University of Central Asia. She teaches photography, new media, and media law and ethics.
