= Elena Kazantseva =

Belarusian poet and singer-songwriter (born 1956)

Elena Kazantseva (born 5 December 1956, in Minsk) is a Belarusian poet and singer-songwriter who writes in Russian. She recorded five music albums with songs on her own poetry and published two books of her poems, "Night City" (1992) and "Concerto (in two parts)" (2002). She sings and plays the guitar and the piano. In 1988, she won Second All-Union festival of song in Tallinn.

== Selected discography ==
- The system of views, Link to CD
- To long, long memory
- Street princess, Link to CD
- Aleshenka rides on a horse cab
- Do you remember, the guard, it was summer...

== Links ==
- Her website in project ASiA
- Her site at golos.de
- Her site in bards.ru
- Women's romance, her concert with Sergei Nikitin: Part 1, Part 2, part3, part 4, part 5
