= Elena Sheynina =

Ukrainian children's writer (born 1965)

Elena Yakovlevna Sheynina, (Ukrainian: Олена Яківна Шейніна, Russian: Елена Яковлевна Шейнина; 1965 Kharkiv, is a modern Ukrainian children's writer, publicist, culturologist. She writes in Ukrainian and in Russian. She is Mother-heroine (has seven children).

== Biography ==
Elena Sheynina graduated secondary school in 1982. After school she studied during 5 semesters engineering science in one of the best soviet technical higher school The Kharkiv Polytechnic Institute National Technical University (NTU "KhPI") ((Ukrainian: Національний технічний університет "Харківський політехнічний інститут")), in the city of Kharkiv. Then she decided to strongly change her study direction. She began to study music and 1991 graduated from Moscow state university of culture and art, the chair of choral conducting.

During 1990s years Elena Sheynina taught music in different secondary schools in Kharkiv.

Since 1998 Elena Sheynina has devoted herself to literary work. She writes books for children. And also she is well known as culturologist for her book "Encyclopedia of symbols" (Russian: Энциклопедия символов) and for a whole number of articles about school, education, psychology of education and pedagogy.

Her interests were in art, literature, and music. She had been taking part many years in the Literature Studio under leading of Honoured teacher of Ukraine Alexandr Okhrimenko and in the City Literature Studio for children in Kharkiv under leading of well noted children's writer Vadim Levin.

== Works ==
Books

- "Encyclopedia of symbols", 2001, 2002, 2006 (Russian: Энциклопедия символов) (АСТ, ФОЛИО, Торсинг, ISBN 5-17-010659-9, ISBN 966-7661-95-4, ISBN 978-5-17-010659-2, ISBN 978-966-7661-95-3)
- Lessons for parents (Russian: "Уроки для родителей") (together with Vadim Levin. – Харьков: Фолио, 2000).
- Winter Ukrainian holidays (Russian: Зимние украинские праздники) (together with E. Levinshtein (Russian: Е. Левинштейн)).
- Encyclopedia for girls (Russian: Энциклопедия для девочек) (together with E. Levinshtein).
- Computer for children (Eksmo, 2005) (Russian: Компьютер для дошколят) (Эксмо, 2005)
- Nativity scene (Ukrainian: "Різдвяний вертеп") (2007)
- Personal computer for school. Training course. (Russian: Персональный компьютер для школьников. Учебный курс) (Эксмо, 2007)
- The myths and legends of Ukrainians (Ukrainian: Міфи та легенди українців) (Харьков: Торсінг, 2009)
- Heroes Of Ukraine (Ukrainian: Герої України) (Харьков: Торсінг, 2011)
- Education in search of a shape: articles on the problems of education and upbringing (Russian: Образование в поисках образа: статьи по проблемам образования и воспитания) (Altaspera Publishing and Literary Agency, 2014).

Series of books "My first encyclopedia"

- The wonderful world of objects (Russian: Удивительный мир предметов) (Эксмо, 2012)
- Our planet Earth (Russian: Наша планета Земля) (Эксмо, 2011)
- Seasons (Russian: Времена года) (Эксмо, 2011)
- Musical instruments (Eksmo, 2011) (Russian: Музыкальные инструменты) (Эксмо, 2011)
- Profession (Eksmo, 2011) (Russian: Профессии) (Эксмо, 2011)
- Flags of the world (Eksmo, 2011) (Russian: Флаги мира) (Эксмо, 2011)
- Trees (Eksmo, 2011) (Russian: Деревья) (Эксмо, 2011)

Compiler of books:

- The Princess and the Pea (Russian: «Принцесса на горошине») (together with Vadim Levin and other Дрофа, 1999)
- The children's library "Ladder " (Детская библиотека "Лесенка", 20 Volumes). (Together with: Vadim Levin and other, 1994.

Articles:

- Children's rights: a tribute to the popular rhetoric or social weapon? (Права детей: дань модной риторике или социальное оружие?))
- The ideal teacher (Идеальный учитель)
- System of Sukhomlinsky and modern school: reflections in the year of the 90th anniversary of the teacher (Система Сухомлинского и современная школа: размышления в год 90-летия педагога)
- The worst handwriting in the classroom (Самый худший почерк в классе)
- Communication in the school as a system of relations (Комунікація у школі як система взаємин)
- Not by bread alone… (Не хлібом єдиним...)
