= Elena Elfimova =

Russian volleyball player (born 1972)

Personal information
- Nationality: Russian
- Born: 28 December 1972 (age 53)
- Height: 192 m (629 ft 11 in)

Volleyball information
- Number: 13 (national team)

Career
Years	Teams
1994	CSKA Moskva

National team
1994	Russia

Elena Elfimova (born 28 December 1972) is a retired Russian female volleyball player. She was part of the Russia women's national volleyball team.

She participated in the 1994 FIVB Volleyball Women's World Championship. On club level she played with CSKA Moskva.

== Clubs ==
- CSKA Moskva (1994)
