= Elena Cuoco =

Italian astrophysicist and data scientist

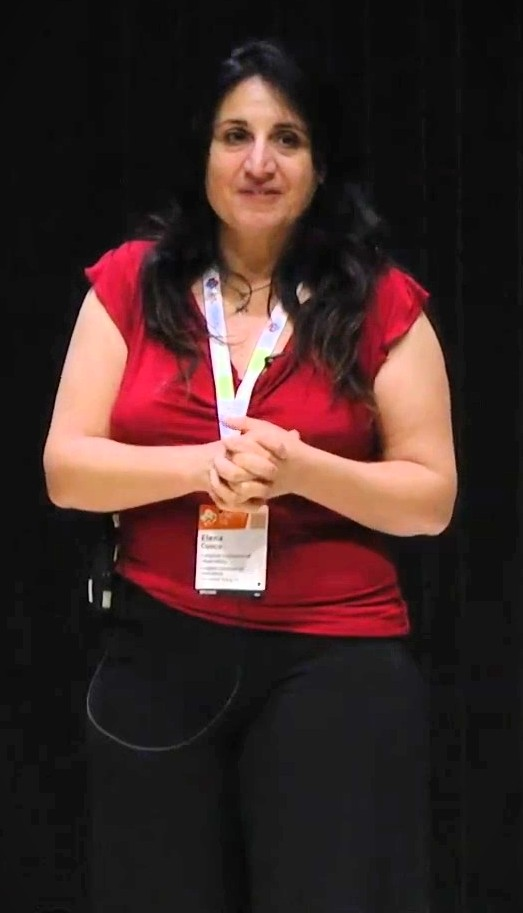
- Cuoco in 2016
- Education: University of Pisa
- Scientific career
- Workplaces: University of Bologna; European Gravitational Observatory
- Thesis: Identificazione dello spettro di rumore di virgo e metodi di rivelazione dei segnali gravitazionali (1997)

Elena Cuoco is an Italian physicist. She is a Full Professor at the University of Bologna, where she teaches Gravitational Wave Physics. She was the Head of Data Science at the European Gravitational Observatory. Cuoco develops machine learning approaches for gravitational wave research. She was part of the team who won the 2017 Breakthrough Prize in Fundamental Physics.

== Early life and education ==
Cuoco became interested in science as a child, and enjoyed imagining the universe when she stared at the dark night sky. She became interested in physics at high school, and eventually studied statistical analysis and astrophysics at university of Pisa. She started a doctoral fellowship at the University of Pisa, where worked on the Virgo experiment.

== Research and career ==
Cuoco is an expert in data analysis. Gravitational wave detectors collect information from astrophysical phenomena, such as the coalescence of binary stars and collapse of massive stars, alongside 'glitches' (noise) – spikes of intensity that occur due to transient noise over a short time. Cuoco develops strategies to identify very faint astrophysical signals from very large noise. She worked on noise analysis for the Virgo interferometer, where she developed analytical algorithms and machine learning that leans the features of noise signals and removes them. She was made responsible for training early career researchers in gravitational wave science and wrote a textbook on Gravitational Wave Science with Machine Learning to improve gravitational wave data analysis. Cuoco developed a COST Action (CA17137) Programme on Gravitational Waves and Machine Learning.

Cuoco was one of the Breakthrough Prize in Fundamental Physics laureates in 2017. In 2018, Cuoco was made Head of Data Science at the European Gravitational Observatory.

Cuoco moved to the University of Bologna in 2024, where she works on the application of artificial intelligence for gravitational wave data analysis. She is one of those responsible for the data analysis platform for the Einstein Telescope, for which she developed data quality assessments and strategies to identify and eliminate noise.

== Selected publications ==
- B.P. Abbott; R. Abbott; T.D. Abbott; et al. (5 February 2017). Observation of Gravitational Waves from a Binary Black Hole Merger. pp. 291–311. Bibcode:2017cgrc.book..291A. doi:10.1142/9789814699662_0011. ISBN 978-981-4699-65-5.
- B P Abbott; R Abbott; T D Abbott; et al. (LIGO Scientific Collaboration and Virgo Collaboration) (15 June 2016). "GW151226: Observation of Gravitational Waves from a 22-Solar-Mass Binary Black Hole Coalescence". Physical Review Letters. 116 (24) 241103. arXiv:1606.04855. Bibcode:2016PhRvL.116x1103A. doi:10.1103/PHYSREVLETT.116.241103. ISSN 0031-9007. PMID 27367379.
- B. P. Abbott; R. Abbott; T. D. Abbott; et al. (4 September 2019). "GWTC-1: A Gravitational-Wave Transient Catalog of Compact Binary Mergers Observed by LIGO and Virgo during the First and Second Observing Runs". Physical Review X. 9 (3) 031040. arXiv:1811.12907. Bibcode:2019PhRvX...9c1040A. doi:10.1103/PHYSREVX.9.031040. ISSN 2160-3308.
