= Elena Presser =

Argentine artist (born 1940)

Elena Presser (born November 3, 1940) is an Argentine artist who focuses on keyboard pieces, specifically on Johann Sebastian Bach's Goldberg Variations. Her artwork is her interpretation of classical music and is defined with shapes and symbols within her artwork. She also includes religious notions affiliated with the high quality of music. She also believes that music is unique to everyone, therefore she decides to primarily include it in her art.

== Biography ==
Elena Presser was born in Buenos Aires, Argentina and has also lived in Florida, California, and Philadelphia. It was in Buenos Aires at age 18, when her interest towards Bach's musical pieces grew substantially, and even more specifically on the Goldberg Variations. Aria with Diverse Variations for a Harpsichord with Two Manuals was a series of piano pieces composed by German composer Johann Sebastian Bach in 1741 which contained the final music series titled Goldberg Variations. Presser often repeatedly listened to the Goldberg Variations in order to detect the underlying differences among the musical composition and its features. Re-listening to these pieces helped Presser transform Bach's compositions into a visual representation and three dimensional form of keyboard music. Presser's various artworks contain numerous forms of medium in which she arranges her interpretation of the Goldberg Variations to her personal tastes. Presser has done interpretations of other music compositions including pieces from the Renaissance, Baroque, and Classical era.

== Education ==
Presser received her education from various universities. In 1962, she attended the University of Buenos Aires and later attended Miami-Dade Community College, where she attained an associate of arts. Furthermore, Presser enrolled in the University of Miami in 1976 and to Florida International University, where she received a bachelor of fine arts degree.

== Art work ==
Unfinished Symphony, 1982: Presser used silk ribbon, wire, paper, pastel, pencil, and silk thread. Presser included a symphony by Austrian composer Franz Schubert. According to Presser, the Unfinished Symphony has both a dramatic drop and a tragic touch to the notes. She assembles the emotions attached to the notes of this symphony by working her way outwards the canvas, with the slow tragedy centered in the middle and the greater tragedy splashed throughout her canvas. Presser intended for the second movement of notes to be more serene and joyous. The middle portion of the canvas includes a cluster of tiles with scattered numbers and letters embedded with darker shades of colors. These tiles were meant to represent the tragic energy evoked by the chords.

Plate III Variation 20 from the Goldberg Variations, 1984: This piece of art included silver wire, paper, nails, pastel, silk thread and pencil. This piece was based on Variation 20 from the Goldberg Variations and has numerous strings stretching from top to bottom, all aligned at the bottom to holes. This symmetrical formation of strings, where each depict a beat, are reflected both vertically and horizontally and were created to form a harpsichord. The strings are held together at the top in a v-shaped form from a top angle, and represents the intensity of human joy and tempo emanating from these chords. The calligraphy inscribed among the structure is the artistic signature of Presser that is constantly seen throughout her various other artworks.

Variation 3, 1983: This artwork consists of sterling silver wire, handcrafted paper, silk thread, pencil and pastel and is based on Variation 3 from the Goldberg Variations. Variation 3 had a time signature of 12/8. This time signature was often regarded as a celestial note by Bach and was an influence to the choice of color in this artwork. This variation has a religious affiliation in regards to Bach and Presser due to the constant recurring theme of unification. On the left side of the canvas there is a script folded in half which is used to depict the unified canon. Among this piece there is a lot of play with light and shadow which causes the three dimensional design of this canvas. There is also calligraphy written on the scroll which is the artistic signature of Elena Presser.

Variation 14, 1983: The media for this artwork consists of sterling silver wire, silk thread, handcrafted paper, pastel, nails, and pencils. On the top middle portion of this canvas there is a pentagon with a smaller pentagon inside of it coming out of the page. The words 14 variations are inscribed in this inner pentagon. The rest of the canvas consists of colorful strings stretched vertically from top to bottom, without overlapping the pentagon located on the top middle portion. However, there is another pentagon reflecting the top pentagon on the center of the canvas. This pentagon has the words Bach Variation G inscribed on it. The pentagon's represent the fifth triad which is three note chords that play simultaneously. There is both mirth and sadness evoked in this piece of artwork with the different colors of strings and notes.

Variation 15, 1983: This media of this artwork is hand crafted paper, pastel, strings, and wires. Variation 15 is from the Golden Variations produced by German composer Johann Sebastian Bach. Presser assembles various geometric shapes that has a strong affiliation with religion and music. On the center of the canvas there is a large circle with an inner square. On top of the rectangle, square and circle there is strings stretched horizontally from the left end to the right end of the canvas. These strings are created to depict a cross to represent the concept of balance. This artwork compares the Variation 9's perfection and divinity with God, especially the canon at the fifth. We also see human perfection inscribed in the shape of the pentagon, with all its five points representing the human anatomy. The pentagon, which consists of five points, also shows the infinite power and unity of humankind along with music notes canon 5 to show music's affiliation with celestial matters. Calligraphy inscribed all over the canvas is the artist's artistic signature.

Variation 26, 1984: The media for this artwork is silk threads, pastel, hand-crafted paper, and beads. There is a circle that covers mostly the whole rectangle canvas. The circle embedded in this piece represent unity and comfort. On the inside of the circle there is strings stretching towards the center of the circle. The strings reinforce these feelings of security and the sense of infinite solace. There is two triangles at the center of the circle that serve as the identity of male and female spirits. The number nine on this canvas represents religious practices of prayers. Variation 26 is dedicated to the Golden Variations composed by Johann Sebastian Bach. The calligraphy in the background is the artist's artistic signature.

Variation 9, 1983: This artwork includes handcrafted paper, sterling silver wire, pastel, pencil, and thread. Variation 9 from the Golden Variations was composed by Johann Sebastian Bach. The bottom portion of this canvas has two symmetrical rectangles that are laying horizontally. These three horizontal rectangles emphasizes the canon at the third wherein they represent three levels of reality. The first level of reality is symbolized as two lines forming a peak that represent religious creation, the Holy Trinity, and Heaven. Inside this peak there is a circle that symbolizes the circle of life and is regarded as the 2nd level of reality. The last level of reality is the three bottom rectangles that represent the reality of music within the canons of this variation. The calligraphy among the back of this canvas is the artistic signature of Elena Presser.

Variation 29, 1984: This is a mixed media that includes handcrafted paper, pencil, thread, and pastel. On the middle there is a pentagon with a decagon inside, and inside that decagon there is star with 10 peaks, and inside that start there is a circle. The pentagon is on a rectangle made out of stretched strings. There are circle outside the triangle that have letters inscribed on them. The rest of the canvas has letters and symbols. Variation 29 was produced by the Golden Variations by German composer Johann Sebastian Bach. The golden variations were created in a symmetrical structure, which is being represented in Elena's Presser's interpretation of Variation 29. Elena Presser is interpreting the movement of this variation as a sonorous dance with the rectangle and the number six being the foundation of the dance. There is a mystical tree that serves as an emblem of divine morals affiliated with God.

== Group exhibitions ==
- Contemporary Art - 1977, Continuum Gallery, Miami
- Two Person Exhibition - 1978, Visual Arts Gallery, F.I.U., Miami
- Women Artists of the '70's - 1978, National Organization for Women, Fort Lauderdale
- 21st M. Allen Hortt Memorial Exhibition - 1979, Fort Lauderdale Museum of Art
- Mixed Media - 1980, Lowe-Levinson Gallery, Miami
- 23rd M. Allen Hortt Memorial Exhibition - 1981, Fort Lauderdale Museum of Art
- Southern Exposure - 1981, Montgomery College Gallery of Art, Washington, D.C.
- Latin American Art : A Woman's View - 1981, Frances Wolfson Art Gallery, Miami
- Florida Women in Art - 1981, Edison Community College, Fort Myers
- Women's Art : Miles Apart - 1982, Aaron Berman Gallery, New York and Valencia Community College, Orlando
- 24th M. Allen Hortt Memorial Exhibition - 1982, Fort Lauderdale Museum of Art
- Directors Choice - 1982, Aaron Berman Gallery, New York
- Florida Artists See Themselves - 1982, Frances Wolfson Art Gallery, Miami
- Women's Vision -1982, Broward Community College, Fort Lauderdale
- Women's Vision - 1983, Philadelphia Arts Alliance, Pennsylvania
- 100 Gloves - 1983, Valencia Community College
- Beyond the Wall - 1983, Aaron Berman Gallery, New York
- Four Arts Regional - 1983, Four Arts Center, Tallahassee
- 25th M. Allen Hortt Memorial Exhibition - 1983, Fort Lauderale Museum of Art
- Mask Media...Faces of '83 - 1983, Netsky Gallery, Miami
- Women's Caucus for Art -1983, Florida, Louisiana, Texas
- Calligraffiti- 1984, Leila Taghinia-Milani Gallery, New York
- 100 Gloves Touring Exhibition - 1984, Crast Center Gallery, North Carolina State University, University of West Florida, Pensacola, Saint Andrews Sewannee School, Tennessee
- Group Show - 1984, Leila Taghinia-Milani Gallery, New York
- Visions of Ourselves - 1984, Valencia Community College, Orlando
- Working Mothers - 1984, Barry College, Miami
- 100 Gloves, Touring Exhibitions - 1985, Polk Public Museum, Lakeland Milledgeville Allied Arts, Georgia, Anderson County Art Center, South Carolina, University of Mississippi Museum

== Solo exhibitions ==
- Works on Paper - 1979, Barbara Gillman Gallery, Miami
- Bach's Goldberg Variations - 1985, Frances Wolfson Art Gallery, Miami, McKissick Museums, Columbia, South Carolina, Center for the Arts, Muhlenberg College, Allentown, Pennsylvania
- Bach's Goldberg Variations - 1986, Michael C. Rockefeller Center for the Arts, Fredonia, New York, Center for the Arts of Kennesaw College, Marietta, Georgia, Art and Culture Center, Hollywood, Florida
- Elena Presser: Transpositions - 1980s

== Collections ==
- State of Florida
- Tallahassee Department of Natural Resources
- Tallahassee Ruth & Marvin Sackner Collection
- Miami Cypress Savings Association
- Planation R.E. Lee & Son
- Charlottesville Ruth & Richard Shack Collection
- Miami Netsky Collection
- Miami Berman Collection
- New York
- NMWA

== Awards ==
- Merit Award, 20th M. Allen Hortt Memorial Exhibition Outstanding Achievement in Art, Florida International University-1978
- Purchase Award, Florida House of Representatives-1979
- Honorable Mention, Thomas Center Gallery Merit Award, 22nd M. Allen Hortt Memorial Exhibition-1980
- Award, Channel 2 Auction Purchase Award, Florida Department of State-1981
- Award, Loch Haven Art Center Fellowship, Florida Arts Council-1982
- Artist-in-residence Fellowship, Djerassi Foundation
- Purchase Award, Second Street Gallery Best in Show Award, Broward Art Gallery-1983
- Merit Award, Celebration of Women Merit Award, Community Art Alliance-1984

== Publications ==
- Elena Presser: Bach's Goldberg Variations written by Elena Presser, S.M. Lurie and Frances Wolfson Art Gallery.
- Elena Presser : Works on the music of Johann Sebastian Bach written by Elena Presser and Paula Hays Harper.
