= Elena Nikoli =

Greek handball player (born 1982)

Elena Nikoli (born May 12, 1982) is a Greek handball player. She has won the Greek championship six times, as well as the Greek cup (1998–2003). She took the third place at the Balkan Games in 2004 and she also participated at the Athens 2004 Olympic Games. She was first called at the Greece women's national handball team in 1998 at the age of 16 years. She played at the following teams: Amazones Artas, Anagennisi Artas and Ormi Patras.
