= Elena Ospitaletche =

Uruguayan swimmer

Personal information
- Born: 1 August 1960 (age 65)

Sport
- Sport: Swimming

Elena Ospitaletche (born 1 August 1960) is a former Uruguayan swimmer. She competed in two events at the 1976 Summer Olympics.
