= Elena Hassinger =

German physicist

Elena Hassinger (born 1982) is a German physicist and professor at the Technische Universität Dresden (TU Dresden). She is known for her work on quantum materials and low temperature physics.

== Career ==
Hassinger studied physics at the University of Heidelberg, and graduated with a Diplom (German degree similar to a Masters) in 2007. She then did graduate studies in the group of Jacques Flouquet at the University of Grenoble and French Alternative Energies and Atomic Energy Commission. She was awarded a PhD in 2010 with a thesis entitled "Competition of ground states in URu2Si2 and UCoGe". She then moved to Canada, and worked as a postdoc in the group of Louis Taillefer at the Université de Sherbrooke until 2014.

Hassinger returned to Germany as a research group leader at the Max Planck Institute for Chemical Physics of Solids (MPI CPfS) in Dresden. In 2021, her group reported the discovery that CeRh2As2 was a superconductor with two superconducting states. In 2016, she was appointed to a tenure-track professorship for "Quantum Materials - Experimental Solid State Physics" at the Technical University of Munich while maintaining her earlier position as part of the "MaxPlanck@TUM" collaboration.

In 2022, she was appointed to a new professorship, as the Chair of Low Temperature Physics of Complex Electron Systems at the Institute of Solid State and Materials Physics at TU Dresden. The professorship was established as part of the Excellence Cluster ct.qmat (Complexity and Topology in Quantum Materials), in which Hassinger is also Principal Investigator. Since 2023, she has been a sub-project leader for the topic "Transport properties of itinerant frustrated and topological magnets" at the Collaborative Research Center SFB 1143 on "Correlated Magnetism: From Frustration to Topology”.

In 2023, Hassinger was awarded a €2.7 million ERC Consolidator Grant for her project "Exotic Quantum States by Locally Broken Inversion Symmetry in Extreme Conditions—Ixtreme.". The project aims to continue working with CeRh2As2 to test for the existence of topological surface states, which would have implications for quantum computing.

== Academic diversity ==
In 2019, Hassinger was a co-author of a paper entitled "A Leak in the Academic Pipeline: Identity and Health Among Postdoctoral Women". She then developed and taught a seminar called "The Big Bang Theory syndrome: Why should we care about stereotypes?", which examined gender stereotypes, and how they affect scientific careers, behavior and perception. For this seminar, she was acknowledged with an award for diversity-sensitive teaching from TU Dresden.
