= Elena Rede =

Italian sculptor

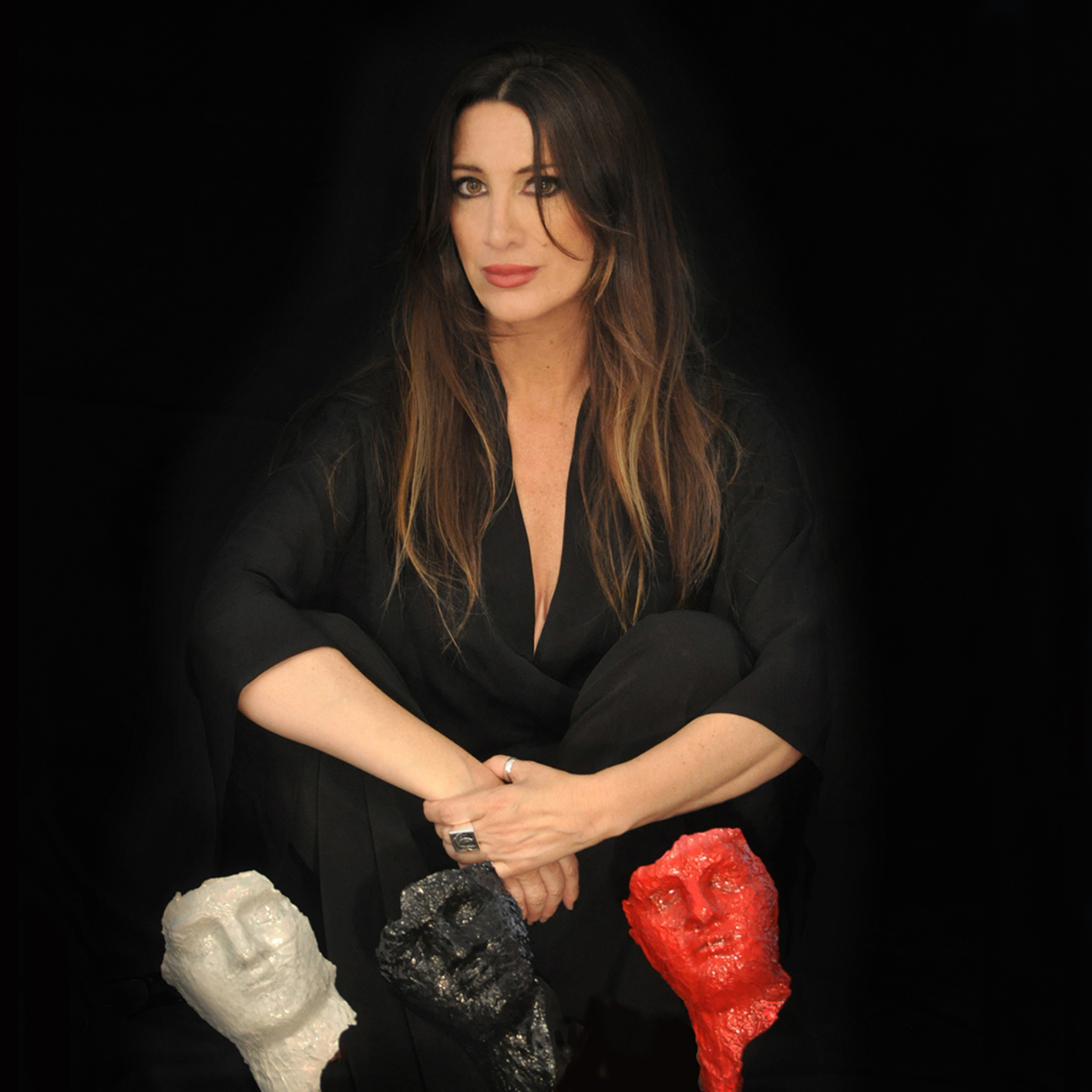
- Rede in 2015
- Born: Elena Re Depaolini; November 18, 1967 (age 58); Milan, Italy
- Education: Arts High School, Accademia di Belle Arti di Brera, Milan
- Known for: Sculpture, performance, drawing, painting
- Notable work: sculptures, performances, paintings
- Movement: contemporary art
- Website: www.elenarede.com

Elena Rede, pseudonym of Elena Re Depaolini (born November 18, 1967), is an Italian sculptor of contemporary art.

== Artistic practice ==
Rede was trained in painting and sculpture in her childhood by her grandfather, a carpenter and sculptor, replicating the mannequins of her parents' tailoring with occasional materials. After graduating from high school, she studied at the Brera Academy of Fine Arts. She deepens her studies in sculpture, but it is the encounter with Igor Mitoraj that drives her to follow her artistic vocation. She exhibited at Villa Pamphilj, Rome, at Stattbad, Berlin, at the Carrousel du Louvre Paris, ad Art Basel, Miami, at the Pavilion Expo Italy Milan, at the Sanat Fuari Istanbul, at the Grimaldi Forum (Principality of Monaco), exhibits from (2011–2012), to the Italian Pavilion of Turin, Sala Nervi, where the 54th Venice Biennale was held, an exhibition dedicated to the 150th anniversary of the unification of Italy by Vittorio Sgarbi, to Matalon Foundation, 2017, Milan, Sanremo with the installation art of public works ‘’Re Nasci’’. They are interested in her artistic production, Giovanni Faccenda, Vittorio Sgarbi, Philippe Daverio, Dario Fo.

== Bibliography ==
- "Gli specchi dell'eternità", by Anthelios, Milan, 2011.
- "Oltre le Muse", by Giovanni Faccenda, Bartolomeo Smaldone, by Giorgio Mondadori, Milan, 2015, ISBN 978-88-6052-625-0.
- "Catalog of Modern Art" n.53, by Giovanni Faccenda, "The Italian Artist from the early twentieth century to today", by Giorgio Mondadori, Milan, 2017. ISBN 978-88-6052-845-2.
- "Catalog of Modern Art" n.54, by Giovanni Faccenda, "The Italian Artist from the early twentieth century to today", by Giorgio Mondadori, Milan, 2018. ISBN 978-88-6052-924-4.
- Catalog, "Verso Itaca, miti, eroi e sublimi astrazioni", da Giorgio de Chirico a Elena Rede, by Giovanni Faccenda, by Ubi Maior, Alassio, 2019. ISBN 978-88-944658-0-8.
- Catalog, "ELENAREDE", A un soffio dal cielo, a un palmo da terra, by Giovanni Faccenda, by Ubi Maior, Alassio, 2019. ISBN 978-88-944658-1-5.
