= Elena Queirolo =

Uruguayan toxicology researcher

Elena Queirolo is an Uruguayan toxicology researcher and advocate who founded the Health Clinic for Environmental Chemical Contaminants at the Pereira Rossell Hospital (Policlínica de Contaminantes Químicos Ambientales del Pereira Rossell), known as the Lead Clinic or Lead Polyclinic. She is affiliated with the Catholic University of Uruguay.

The clinic was founded in April 2001 in response to the La Teja incident, in which the public became aware of lead and other chemical exposure to children. After the incident, the clinic and Queirolo became data collectors and advocates for establishing lead exposure standards more similar to the guidelines in the US and Canada.

She has been a primary investigator on several major international studies of exposure of children to lead and other chemicals, such as arsenic.
