= Elena Boledovičová =

Slovak handball player (born 1953)

Elena Boledovičová (born 9 May 1953 in Bratislava) is a former Czechoslovak/Slovak handball player who competed in the 1980 Summer Olympics.

In 1980 she was part of the Czechoslovak team which finished fifth in the Olympic tournament. She played all five matches and scored one goal.
