= Elena Lucchinelli =

Italian cyclist

Personal information
- Born: 24 October 2001 (age 24) La Spezia, Liguria, Italy

Cycling career
- Sport: Cycling
- Discipline: Road
- Role: Rider

Professional team
- 2020: Aromitalia–Basso Bikes–Vaiano

Elena Lucchinelli (born 24 October 2001) is an Italian professional racing cyclist, who most recently rode for UCI Women's Continental Team Aromitalia–Basso Bikes–Vaiano.
