= Elena Celledoni =

Italian mathematician (born 1967)

Elena Celledoni (born 1967) is an Italian mathematician who works in Norway as a professor of mathematical sciences at the Norwegian University of Science and Technology (NTNU). Her research involves the numerical analysis of numerical algorithms for partial differential equations and for Lie group computations, including the study of structure preserving algorithms.

== Education and career ==
Celledoni earned a master's degree at the University of Trieste in 1993. She completed a Ph.D. at the University of Padua in 1997. Her dissertation, Krylov Subspace Methods For Linear Systems Of ODEs, was jointly supervised by Igor Moret and Alfredo Bellen.

Before becoming a faculty member at NTNU in 2004, she was a postdoctoral researcher at the University of Cambridge, at the Mathematical Sciences Research Institute, and at NTNU.

== Recognition ==
Celledoni is a member of the Royal Norwegian Society of Sciences and Letters.
