= Elena Agafonnikova =

Russian basketball player

Personal information
- Born: March 14, 1965 (age 61) Volgograd, Soviet Union
- Listed height: 1.75 m (5 ft 9 in)

Career history
- ?: ŁKS Łódź
- ?: Dynamo Moscow

Elena Agafonnikova (born March 14, 1965) is a former Soviet and Russian female professional basketball player.
