= Elena Rivera =

Elena Rivera may refer to:

- Elena Rivera Mirano (born 1951), Filipino scholar;
- Elena Rivera (born 1992), Spanish actress.
