= Elena Jikhareva =

Russian footballer (born 1974)

Personal information
- Full name: Elena Jikhareva
- Date of birth: 8 July 1974 (age 52)
- Position: Defender

Senior career*
Years	Team	Apps	(Gls)
- Ryazan-VDV

International career
- Russia
- * Club domestic league appearances and goals

Elena Jikhareva (born 8 July 1974) is a former Russian footballer who played as a defender for the Russia women's national football team. She was part of the team at the UEFA Women's Euro 2001. On club level she played for Ryazan-VDV in Russia.
