= Elena Oana Antonescu =

Romanian politician (born 1979)

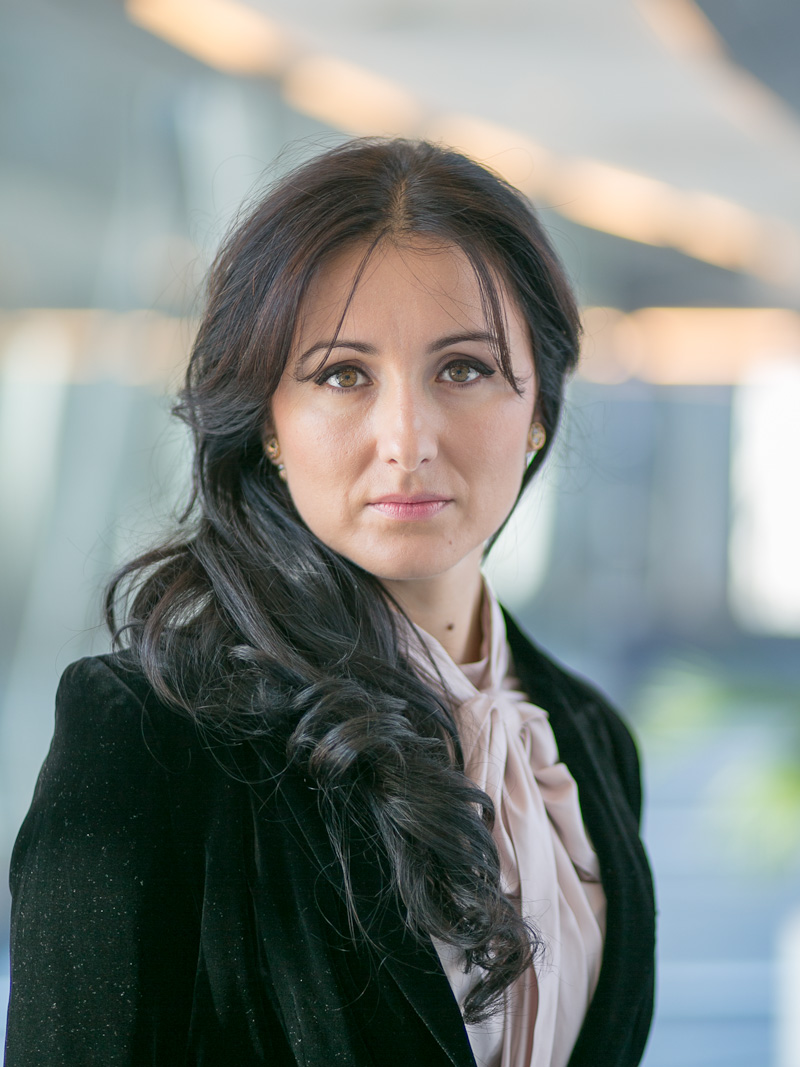
Elena Oana Antonescu

Elena Oana Antonescu (born 30 December 1979) is a Romanian politician, lawyer and Member of the European Parliament (MEP). A member of the Democratic Liberal Party (DLP) since 2001, part of the European People's Party (Christian Democrats), she became a Member of the European Parliament on 16 June 2009.

She was born in Târgoviște. Since starting her term, Oana Antonescu sits on the Committee on the Environment, Public Health and Food Safety. She is a substitute for the Committee on Civil Liberties, Justice and Home Affairs. Her activity was focused on ensuring equal access to healthcare and promoting healthy lifestyle policies, as well as on ensuring the rights of European citizens facing criminal proceedings.

As MEP, she has been the EPP's Rapporteur for the Directive on the right to interpretation and translation in criminal proceedings in 2009 and for the Directive on the right to information in criminal proceedings in 2010. In 2011 she was designated to be the European Parliament's Rapporteur for the Directive on the right of access to a lawyer in criminal proceedings and on the right to communicate upon arrest.

She is a founding member of the European Parliament's Intergroup concerning Complementary and Alternative Healthcare.

In 2013, she became a patron of Fair Trials International.
