= Elena Mestergazi =

Russian academic

Elena Georgievna Mestergazi
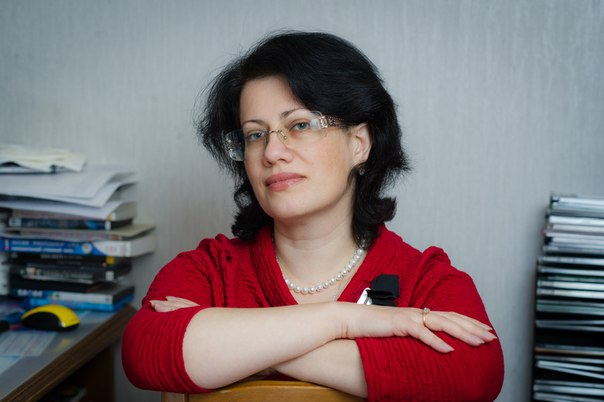
- Elena Mestergazi
- Born: September 8, 1967 (age 58)
- Education: University of Moscow
- Scientific career
- Fields: Documentary prose, literary criticism, literary studies

Elena Georgievna Mestergazi (Russian: Елена Георгиевна Местергази; born in 1967, Kaluga) is a Russian literary scholar who specializes in literary theory and 19th, 20th and 21st century Russian literature. She has also worked extensively on the life and oeuvre Vladimir Pecherin. As a doctor of philology (2008), she has authored monographs and journal articles and is an editor and member of editorial boards for several collections of domestic scientists' articles.

== Biography ==
- 1991 - Graduated from Lomonosov Moscow State University.
- 1991-1997 - Full-time postgraduate studies in the Department of Literary Theory at the Gorky Institute of World Literature, Russian Academy of Sciences (IWL RAS)
- 1998 - Defended her master's thesis and joined the Department of Literary Theory staff at IWL RAS as a researcher.
- 2000-2011 - Senior researcher in the Department of Literary Theory, IWL RAS.
- 2006-2007 - Academic secretary for the Department of Literary Theory, IWL RAS.
- 2008 - Defended her doctoral thesis on the topic of literary theory and text linguistics.
- May 27, 2008 - Initiated and organized the round table "Literature and document: theoretical understanding of the subject" at IWL RAS.
- April 23, 2010 - Initiated and organized the second round table "Literature and document: theoretical understanding of the subject" at IWL RAS.

== Scientific activity ==
Mestergazi has studied documentary principle in literature. Her monograph "Non-Fiction Experimental Encyclopedia; Russian version" is an attempt at generalizing and systematizing the problems associated with the "uninvented" prose phenomenon in Russian literature. It seeks to give a complete picture of the development of this kind of literature, describing and systematizing the existing terminology, and examining the complex theoretical and literary problems connected with studying this kind of work. E.G. Mestergazi's interests also include analysis of the writer's biography, creative work, and life problems. E.G. Mestergazi has devoted almost a quarter of a century to studying the life and works of one of the first Russian emigrants: the poet, philologist, and author of "Sepulchral notes", Vladimir Sergeevich Pecherin (1807-1885). Her work has resulted in two monographs, in which Pecherin is biographically examined both as a writer and as a character of Russian culture.

== Books ==
1. E.G. Mestergazi. Documentary principle in the literature of the twentieth century: monograph / E.G. Mestergazi. M: Flinta: Nauka. 2006. – 160 pages. ISBN 5-9765-0184-2
  Rev.: Nina Guschina. The document at the heart // Moskovskaya pravda. No. 240 (25537). October 31, 2006 p. 4; Rev.: Nicholay Modestov. Fact and fiction // Moskovskaya sreda. No. 41 (196). November 8–14, 2006 p. 18; Rev.: Airat Sagdatov. To lovers of literature // Rossiyskaya gazeta. Souyz Belarus – Rossija. No. 281 (4247). December 14, 2006 p. III; Rev.: Danila Davydov. Two in one // Book review. 2007. No. 3-4 (2117-2118). p. 9.
2. E.G.Mestergazi. Theoretical aspects of study of the writer's biography (V.S. Pecherin): the monograph / E.G.Mestergazi; translated from French by I.V.Mestergazi. M: Flinta: Nauka, 2007. – 160 pages. ISBN 978-5-9765-0164-5
  Rev.: Andrey Miroshkin. “And I went to the West ...” // Book Review. 2007. No. 25/26. p11; Rev.: Sergey Kormilov. E.G.Mestergazi. Theoretical aspects of study of the writer's biography (V.S. Pecherin). M: Flinta: Nauka, 2007. - 160 pages // Bulletin of Moscow University. Edition 9: Philology. 2009. No. 2. March–April. pp. 173–178.
3. E.G.Mestergazi. Non-fiction / Non-fiction. Experimental encyclopedia. Russian version. M: Sovpadenie, 2007. - 340 pages. (Published with financial support from the Federal Agency for Press and Mass Communications in the “Culture of Russia” Federal target program). ISBN 978-5-903060-53-5
  Rev.: Olga Balla. On the other side of the alphabet. About non-fiction – from scratch // Nezavisimaya gazeta. Ex Libris. 20.03.2008. No. 10. p. 10; Rev.: Alla Bolshakova. Speak out and the world will change // Literaturnaya gazeta. 09.04.2008. No. 15 (6167); Rev.: Alexander Gerasimov. Science of facts: between truth and falsehood // Moskovskaya pravda. 15.04.2008.
4. E.G.Mestergazi. V.S.Pecherin as a character of Russian culture. M: Sovpadenie, 2013. – 296 pages. ISBN 978-5-903060-69-6
  Rev.: Alexander Markov. Ballad about the spiritual soldier // Russian Journal. 10.12.12; Rev.: Alexander Egorunin. Townsman of the future // Moskovskaya pravda. 13.12.12.

== Scientific editing ==
V.D.Skvoznikov. Against decadence. Articles of different years / Scientific. ed. E.G.Mestergazi. M, 2007. -472 pages.
Rev.: Alla Bolshakova. [Book review:] V.Skvoznikov. "Against decadence" // Slovo. 28.03.2008; Rev.: Danila Davidov. Not only Pushkin // Book Review. 2008. No. 14 (2180). p 15.

== Publications ==
1. V.I.Zykova, V.A. Mikhailov. Blessed memory of the son. Reminiscences of the parents of A.V.Mikhailov / Publication by E.G.Mestergazi // Literary studies as a problem. Proceedings of the Scientific Council “Literary science in the context of cultural sciences”. In memory of Alexander Viktorovich Mikhailov. M, 2001. pp. 7–34.
2. A.V.Mikhailov. Transcript of the report “A few theses on literary theory”, presented at the meeting of the Scientific Council “Literary science in the context of cultural sciences” on January 20, 1993 / Publication by E.G.Mestergazi // Ibid. pp. 201–223.
3. A.V.Mikhailov. A few theses on literary theory / Publication by E.G.Mestergazi // Ibid. pp. 224–279.
4. A.A.Saburov. Pecherin and “The Brothers Karamazov” / Publishing, introduction and notes by E.G.Mestergazi // Dostoevsky: additions to the comment. Gorky Institute of World Literature / Ed. by T.A.Kasatkina. M, 2005. pp. 487–508.
5. V.B.Shklovsky. Dostoevsky's characters. October 10, 1921 / Publication and comments by E.G.Mestergazi // Free philosophical association: 1919-1924 / prepared by E.V.Ivanova with the participation of E.G.Mestergazi. Moscow, 2010. pp. 327–362.
6. A.Z.Steinberg. Dostoevsky as a philosopher. October 16, 1921 / Publication and comments by E.G.Mestergazi // Ibid. pp. 363–419.
7. Ivanov-Razumnik. Dostoevsky, Leontiev and the idea of world revolution. November 13, 1921 / Publication and comments by E.G.Mestergazi // Ibid. pp. 420–471.
8. Literature and document: theoretical understanding of the subject (proceedings of the “round table”) / Prepared by E.G.Mestergazi // Literaturnaya ucheba. 2009. No. 1. pp. 198–210.
9. Round table “Literature and document” / Prepared by E.G.Mestergazi // Book Review. 14 (2284). June 14–27, 2010. p. 10.

== Editorial and publishing activity ==
1. BEGINNING. Collected works from young scientists. No. IV. M, 1998. – 416 pages. Editorial board member
2. Literary studies as a problem. Proceedings of the Scientific Council “Literary science in the context of cultural sciences”. In memory of Alexander Viktorovich Mikhailov. M, 2001. – 600 pages. Editor-in-chief
3. Literary theory. Volume IV. Literary process. M, 2001. - 624 pages Editorial board member
4. Literary and theoretical results of the 20th century. M, 2003. Volume 1. Lit. work and lit. process. – 373 pages Academic secretary of the publication; Editorial board member
5. Literary and theoretical results of the 20th century. M, 2003. Volume 2. Literary text and cultural context. – 447 pages Academic secretary of the publication; Editorial board member
6. Free philosophical association: 1919-1924 / prepared by E.V.Ivanova with the participation of E.G.Mestergazi. M, 2010. - 483 pages.
