= Elena Torre =

Italian writer (born 1973)

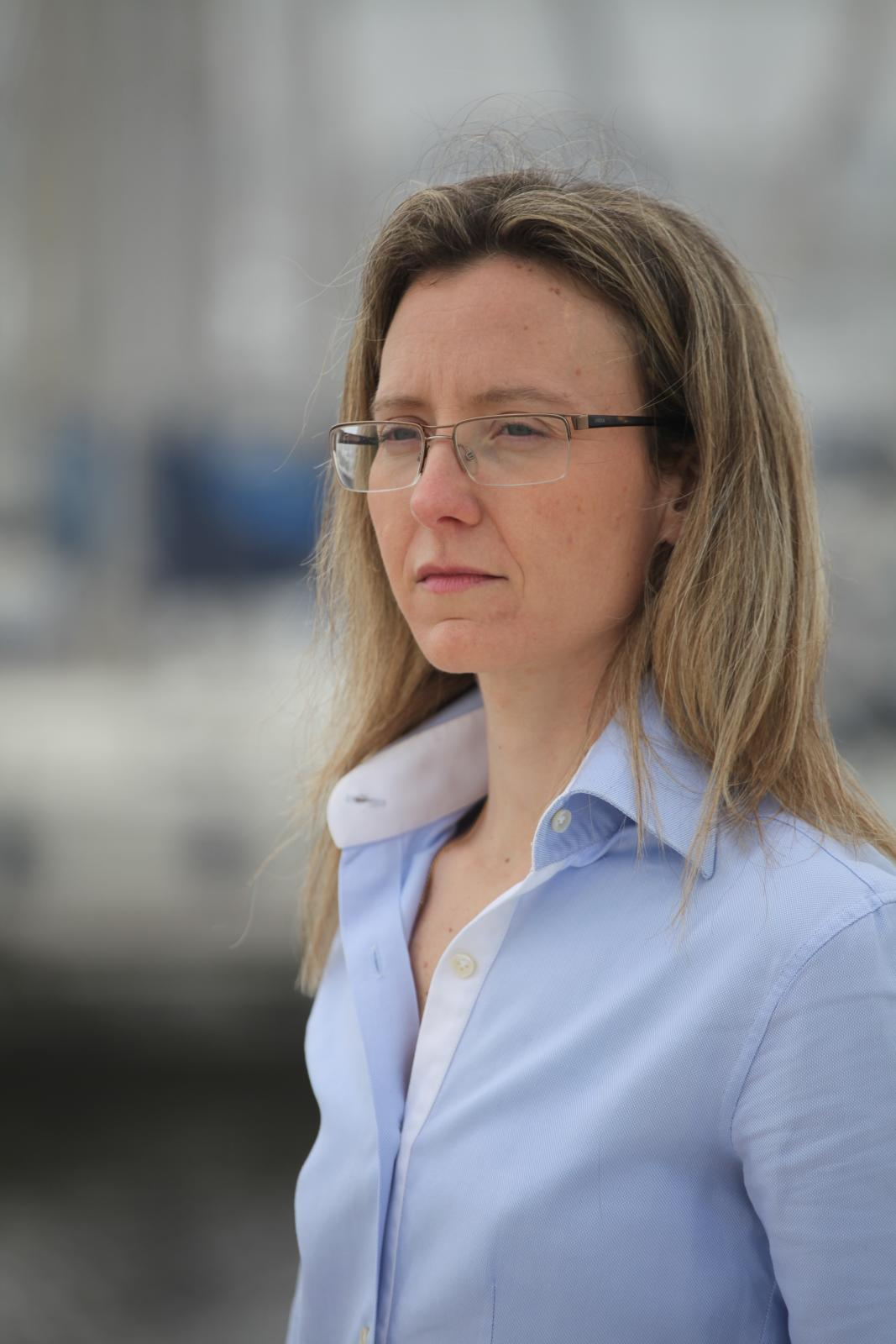
- Born: October 30, 1973 (age 51); Italy
- Occupation: Writer

Elena Torre (born October 30, 1973) is an Italian writer.

She graduated in modern literature at the University of Pisa, after training in journalism at some local radio stations. Torre is dedicated to the printed paper, and works with the society and culture page of the newspaper Il Tirreno, and Mangialibri where she deals with book reviews and interviews with personalities from the world of culture, music and entertainment.
