= Elena Kriegner =

Austrian jewelry designer (born 1968)

- Born: October 19, 1968 (age 58); Austria
- Education: Master's degree as Goldsmith
- Occupation: Jewelry designer
- Website: ElenaKriegner.com

Elena Kriegner (born October 19, 1968) is a business owner, specializing in jewelry design. She lived and studied in Austria, where she opened her first jewelry workshop after graduating with a master's degree. She later moved to New York City, where she set up her jewelry business.

Kriegner has won a number of prestigious jewelry awards in North America and made a name for herself by creating an innovative ring design in 2015, which solved the ring size problem for both consumers and retailers.

She has also featured in the media for several branding issues over the term, Uber.

== Early life and education ==
Kriegner grew up in the village of Winklpoint in Austria. She started designing jewelry at age 10, which was an uncommon choice for a young girl from rural Austria. She was educated in Austria, going on to graduate with a master's degree as a goldsmith.

== Career ==
After graduating from school, Kriegner made the decision to open her jewelry business in Austria, with her workshop based at her family home. Kriegner also spent some time in South Africa, where she learned various techniques involving gemstones, which would later play a large role in her jewelry business.

She remained at the family home for 14 years, before moving to the Caribbean and then to the United States. Much of her early work was focused on custom designs for clients, with gems and gold combined into various jewelry pieces, such as rings and necklaces.

In 2008, Kriegner finished in third position for the Jeweler In The Net Design Competition. She later attracted attention for the name of one of her 2008 ranges, which was titled Uber, which featured cocktail rings holding enclosed diamond wedding bands, altering the day-to-day look, and providing a new look for divorcees looking to reuse their rings. She eventually set up her business in Chelsea, New York City. Her designs, after moving to the United States, remained quite similar to former works, focusing predominantly on ring design. In 2010, she was featured in the book, 500 Gemstone Jewels, which was published by Lark Books.

While forming her business, Uber Inc., Elena and her sister, Herta, shared an office space in New York City with a shared phone number. Uber did not have a local customer complaints number, which led to frequent misdialed calls from drivers and Uber users.

The confusion with Uber became more of a problem for the sisters when they started to receive complex complaints from customers, such as driver harassment, as well as subpoenas. After speaking with Uber executives at the tradeshow, they were very dismissive of Elena and her sisters issues. The problems reached a point where the major New York City media covered Uber's lack of customer service in-depth, interviewing both Elena and her sister, Herta.

In 2013, Kriegner's work was featured at the Forbes jewelry exhibition, for “Out of this World” Jewelry. During the same year, she was also a finalist at the Jewelers Choice Awards 2013.

Many of her jewelry pieces contain large gems. In June 2015, she featured in WAG magazine to discuss her new range, The Voyage Collection. During the interview, she spoke at length about the design of the jewelry, stating it came in a variety of price and cuts, and every item was convertible from a ring into a pendant.

The jewelry collection received more coverage in the media after Kriegner revealed her latest ring innovation. The problem was that she noticed many complex ring designs were only available in the most common sizes, between 6-9. However the ring size range was from 3 to 14, meaning people at either end of the scale often had to buy custom rings, which could dramatically increase the cost. Kriegner's solution was to develop rings separately from the decorative designs, meaning they could be easily fitted, lowering inventory cost to stores that stocked her jewelry.

== Personal life ==
Kriegner is an avid sailor and has sailed across the Atlantic and also across the United States, north to south, navigating rivers and lakes. When moving from Europe to the United States, she did so by captaining a 32 ft Catamaran and crossing the Atlantic Ocean first. After spending time in the Caribbean, she eventually moved to New York City.
