= Elena Brezányiová =

Slovak handball player (born 1958)

Elena Brezányiová (born April 3, 1958 in Partizánske) is a former Czechoslovak/Slovak handball player who competed in the 1980 Summer Olympics.

In 1980 she was part of the Czechoslovak team which finished fifth in the Olympic tournament. She played all five matches and scored six goals.
