= Elena Oznobkina =

Russian philosopher and human rights activist (1959–2010)

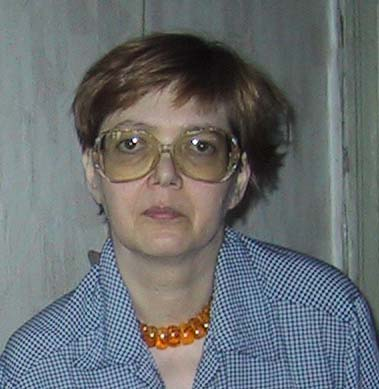
- Elena Oznobkina in 2003
- Born: April 25, 1959; Moscow, Russian SFSR, Soviet Union
- Died: March 14, 2010 (aged 50); Moscow, Russian Federation

Philosophical work
- Era: 20th-century philosophy
- Region: Western Philosophy

Elena Vyacheslavovna Oznobkina (Russian: Елена Вячеславовна Ознобкина; 25 April 1959 – 10 March 2010) was a philosopher, theorist, historian of philosophy, lecturer, translator, editor, journalist, researcher of penitentiary systems, and Russian human rights activist. She is best known as a researcher of modern Western philosophy, a translator and editor of translations of Nietzsche and Husserl into Russian, a critic of the Russian penitentiary system, and the editor of the Russian edition of Index on Censorship magazine.

== Life and career ==
Born in Moscow USSR, Oznobkina grew up in a family, whose parents were a government official and an agricultural scientist. She received a typical cultured middle-class upbringing. Oznobkina attended Moscow State University from 1977 to 1982, majoring in the history of Western philosophy. She defended her Specialist Diploma thesis, entitled "The Unity of three Kant's Critiques", in 1982. After graduation, Oznobkina worked as a lecturer/assistant professor at the Moscow Institute of Agricultural Engineers, and did research as a part-time graduate student at the Institute of Philosophy of the Academy of Sciences of USSR.

She defended her Candidate of Science Dissertation (equivalent of PhD. thesis), entitled "Heidegger's Critique of Kant", in 1987, and become a researcher at the Institute of Philosophy of the Academy of Sciences of USSR in 1988.

She worked at the Institute of Philosophy since 1988, first, as a researcher, at the section of Postclassic Western Philosophy, and afterwards, as a senior researcher, at the section of the section of Analytical Anthropology until her death, which followed after a long period of incurable disease, which limited her to her apartment in the last years of her life.

As it often happens in Russian philosophy, her thought found its expression not in monographs, but mostly in articles, university courses, interviews, and reviews. Although these are "small forms", they were no less influential, than many books. As well, her editorship legacy is very influential in ideological culture of modern Russia.

== Academic activity ==
In 1982 Oznobkina started her academic career as Lecturer/Assistant Professor at the Moscow institute of Agricultural Engineers, where she delivered various courses on history of philosophy until 1987, when she became a full-time researcher. In 1993–2002, she was an invited lecturer at the Russian State University for the Humanities and at State Academic University for the Humanities. She developed and taught such courses as: "Introduction into Philosophical Anthropology", "Corporeality in Philosophy of Modernity", "Kant's Anthropology: Modern Revision", "Classic and Modern Philosophy of Punishment", and others.

=== Kant's Anthropology ===
In a series of lectures for Russian State University for the Humanities, Oznobkina built an interpretation of Kant, which is in many ways opposite to the classic for modern Russia, Merab Mamardashvili's interpretation. She insists that Kant's philosophical experience is very "aggressive", and entails removal of many phenomena from the space of classic European philosophy, due to natural language limitation. Oznobkina states that comparison of Kant's logic and classic logic allows to discover borders of Kant's "cultural utopia", and causes of incongruency of his philosophical language.

== Editorship, translation and publishing activities ==
In last 15 years, Oznobkina concentrated her research interests on the analytical critique of penitentiary system. She combined it with research on variegated aspects of the Russian and Soviet prison system, and the promotion of human rights of prisoners. She was one of editors of the Russian edition of the Index on Censorship magazine (from 1997).

She was also a prominent translator and editor of the modern Russian translations of works of Nietzsche and Husserl, as well as other Western philosophers.

She edited many important Russian books on philosophy and human rights.

She actively published in leading Russian literary magazines.

== Human rights activism ==
Starting in 1992 Oznobkina became active in human rights movement. She participated in activities of the "Glastnost Defence Foundation", and the Committee for Public Investigation on Chechnya (since 1994),.

== Other activities ==
Oznobkina was an avid philatelist, and published several articles in Russian philatelist magazines.

== Selected bibliography ==
=== Articles ===
1. Death punishment (in Russian), "Personal Development"

=== Interviews and talks ===
1. Interview with V. Podoroga

=== Reviews ===
1. Review of "Thoughts of Death Punishment"
2. Review of "Prison cubculture in Russia"
3. Revier of "Abolition of Death Punishment"

=== Books edited ===
1. Filosofskie Marginalii by Institut filosofii (Akademiia nauk SSSR), E. V. Oznobkina ISBN 5-201-01818-1 Hardcover, Akademiia nauk SSSR, In-t filosofii.
2. KGB—Vchera, Segodnia, Zavtra: Mezhdunarodnye Konferentsii I Kruglye Stoly Zakonodatelstvo, Obshchestvennyi Kontrol, Spetssluzhby I Prava Cheloveka, by E. V. Oznobkina, TSentr po informatsii i analizu deiatelnosti rossiiskikh spetssluzhb (Moscow, Russia) ISBN 5-88445-005-2 Hardcover, Izd-vo Znak-SP.
3. KGB—Vchera, Segodnia, Zavtra: Sbornik Dokladov by E. V. Oznobkina, Liliia Isakova ISBN 5-88044-051-6 Hardcover, Gendalf.
4. Voina V Chechne: Mezhdunarodnyi Tribunal Rabochaia Vstrecha, Stokgolm, 15-16 Dekabria, 1995 by E. V. Oznobkina, Liliia Isakova, Obshchestvennyi fond Glasnost (Moscow, Russia) ISBN 5-88445-007-9 Hardcover, Obshchestvennyi fond Glasnost.
