= Elena Moskalová-Poláková =

Czech volleyball player (born 1948)

Personal information
- Nationality: Czech
- Born: 20 April 1948 (age 76); Jablonec nad Nisou, Czechoslovakia

Sport
- Sport: Volleyball

Elena Moskalová-Poláková (born 20 April 1948) is a Czech volleyball player. She competed at the 1968 Summer Olympics and the 1972 Summer Olympics.
