= Elena Sánchez =

Elena Sánchez may refer to:

- Elena Sánchez Valenzuela (1900–1950), Mexican actress and archivist
- Elena Sánchez Caballero (born 1957), Spanish journalist
- Elena S. Sánchez (born 1979), Spanish journalist and television presenter
- Elena Sánchez (water polo) (born 1994), Spanish water polo player
