= Elena Chernenko =

Elena Chernenko may refer to:

- Elena Chernenko (politician) (born 1957), Transnistrian politician
- Elena Chernenko (journalist), Russian journalist and antiwar activist
