= Elena Vardanyan =

Armenian actress (born 1984)

- Born: Elena Vardanyan; April 22, 1984 (age 40); Yerevan, Armenian SSR, Soviet Union
- Education: Stanislavski Russian Theatre of Yerevan
- Occupation: Actress
- Years active: 2008–present

Elena Vardanyan (Armenian: Ելենա Վարդանյան, born on April 22, 1984), is an Armenian actress. She is known for her roles as Koko on Kargin Serial, Nelli Vardanovna on Domino (Armenian TV series). She has played in many performances, such as Stop and Everything is selling.

== Filmography ==
Film
Year	Title	Role	Notes
2013	"Caucho"	Weeping Theatre Actress	

Television and web
Year	Title	Role	Notes
2015–present	Domino (Armenian TV series)	Nelli Vardanovna	Recurring cast
2011-2012	Kargin Serial	Lulu	Recurring cast
2010-2012	Yere1		Recurring cast
