= Elena Makhnev =

Mexican musician

Elena Makhnev is a young violinist from the state of Guanajuato, who has been described as a “virtuoso”.

Her repertoire includes works by Pablo de Sarasate, Niccolò Paganini, Astor Piazzolla and Camille Saint-Saëns such as Capricho No. 13 by Paganini and Aires Gitanos by Sarasate, which are noted for their technical difficulty. Most of the rest of the works are from Italy, Spain, France and Argentina.

She has performed with pianist Carlos Salmerón and her father Stanislav Makhnev, at the Festival Internacional Cervantino.

She is currently a student at the prestigious Tchaikovsky Conservatory in Moscow. She has appeared in various concerts in the state of Guanajuato and won various awards at musical competitions.
