= Elena Paunero Ruiz =

Spanish botanist (1906–2009)

Elena Paunero Ruiz (born 21 September 1906 in Valladolid — 9 March 2009 in Madrid) was a Spanish botanist and agrostologist who specialized in agricultural botany. She worked for many years at the Real Jardín Botánico de Madrid (Royal Botanical Garden of Madrid).

== Early life ==
Elena Paunero Ruiz was born in Valladolid. She was educated and trained in Madrid, receiving her baccalaureate from the Instituto de Enseñanza Secundaria San Isidro (IES San Isidro). She became a member of the Spanish Royal Society of Natural History in 1926 at the age of 20. She received her doctorate from the University of Madrid in 1929 where she wrote her dissertation on crop molds.

== Career ==
In 1927 she joined the phytography section of the Real Jardín Botánico de Madrid. As a curator, she was dedicated to the study of native Spanish grasses. In 1948 she created the agrostology laboratory, becoming head of it. She also taught at the University of Madrid from 1940 on phytography and botanical geography and also, from 1941 to 1949, on plant ecology. In 1962, Ruiz became head of the Herbarium Section of the Botanical Garden.

Following a change in director to the Botanical Garden, Ruiz (who was close to the previous director and seen as his "right hand") felt increasingly uncomfortable with changes made to the garden. This motivated her to retire early.

== Personal life ==
She married Clemente Sanz Rubert, a member of the local gentry who died in a car accident in 1940. Ruiz inherited her husband's estate, which gave her the means to dedicate herself to botanical research.

== Publications ==
- Paunero, Elena. 1953. Las andropogoneas españolas
- Paunero, Elena. 1956. Las aveneas españolas
- Paunero, Elena. 1957. Las agrostideas españolas

For a complete list of publications, see P. Blanco & P. Montserrat. 2007. ″Elena Paunero Ruiz, conservadora de Herbarios del Jardín Botánico de Madrid, centenaria.″ Bol. Asoc. Herb. Ibero-Macar. 8-9: 24–30.
