= Elena Yanovskaya =

Soviet and Russian mathematician and economist

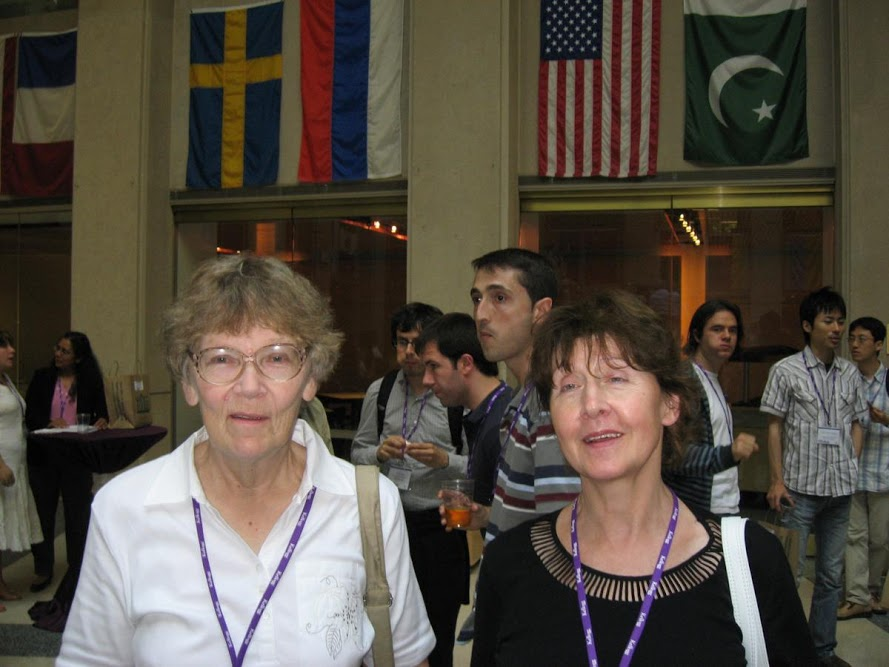
- Elena Yanovskaya and Natalia Naumova (Third World Congress of the Game Theory Society)
- Born: 20 May 1938 (age 88); Leningrad, Soviet Union
- Education: Leningrad State University
- Awards: Kantorovich Prize (2014)
- Scientific career
- Fields: Game theory

Elena Yanovskaya (Russian: Еле́на Бори́совна Яно́вская, born 20 May 1938) is a Soviet and Russian mathematician and economist known for her contributions to cooperative game theory.

== Biography ==
Elena Yanovskaya was born in Leningrad on May 20, 1938.

She studied at the School of Mathematics and Mechanics of the Leningrad State University majoring in probability theory and statistics. After graduation in 1959, she started working as a junior researcher at the Leningrad Department of Steklov Institute of Mathematics, where she worked until 1965. Yanovskaya defended her doctoral thesis (Candidate of Sciences) in 1964. From 1965 to 1975, Yanovskaya worked at the Leningrad branch of the Central Economic Mathematical Institute, where she started as a junior researcher and became the head of the game theory lab. From 1975 to 1990, she worked at the Institute of Socio-Economic Problems of the USSR Academy of Sciences. Yanovskaya defended her postdoctoral thesis (Doctor of Sciences) in 1980. From 1990 to 2015, she worked as the head of the laboratory of Game Theory and Decision Making of the St. Petersburg Economics and Mathematics Institute. Since 2009 she works as a professor at the St. Petersburg campus of the Higher School of Economics.

== Publications ==
- E. B. Janovskaya, “Minimax Theorems for Games on Unit Square”, Theory Probab. Appl., 9:3 (1964), 500–502
- E. B. Yanovskaya, “The solution of the infinite zero-sum two-person games infinite-additive strategies”, Theory Probab. Appl., 15:1 (1970), 153–158
- E. B. Yanovskaya, “Infinite antagonistic games”, J. Soviet Math., 2:5 (1974), 520–541
- E. B. Yanovskaya, “Axiomatic characterization of maximin and lexicographically maximin solutions of bargaining schemes”, Autom. Remote Control, 46 (1985), 1177–1185
- E. B. Yanovskaya, “Group choice rules in problems with comparisons of individual preferences”, Autom. Remote Control, 50:6 (1989), 822–830
- Naumova N.I., Yanovskaya E. Nash Social Choice Orderings. "Mathematical Social Sciences", 2001, vol.42, N3, 203–231;
- Yanovskaya E. Proportional values for TU games. International Journal of Mathematics, Game Theory and Algebra. Nova Sci.Publishers, 2006, vol.16, issue 3.
- Elena Yanovskaya, “One More Uniqueness of the Shapley Value”, Contributions to Game Theory and Management, 1 (2007), 504–523
- Elena B. Yanovskaya, “The Nucleolus and the τ-value of Interval Games”, Contributions to Game Theory and Management, 3 (2010), 421–430
- Elena B. Yanovskaya, “Consistent Subsolutions of the Least Core”, Contributions to Game Theory and Management, 5 (2012), 321–333
- Elena B. Yanovskaya, “The bounded core for games with restricted cooperation”, Autom. Remote Control, 77:9 (2016), 1699–1710

== Awards ==
Kantorovich Prize (2014) "for the work on the cooperative approach to problems of aggregation and distribution".
