= Elena Novelli =

Italian social scientist

- Born: Milan
- Education: Bocconi University
- Scientific career
- Workplaces: Bayes Business School; University of Bath
- Thesis: Technology Development and Commercialization Strategies for Innovative Firms (2010)

Elena Novelli is an Italian social scientist who is Professor of Strategy at the Bayes Business School. She looks to understand the knowledge, decision making and values of businesses and individuals.

== Early life and education ==
Novelli studied business administration at Bocconi University. Her doctoral research was selected by the Academy of Management as one of that year's Best Dissertations. After graduating, she moved to the University of Bath, where she worked in Strategy and International Management.

== Research and career ==
Novelli joined Bayes Business School in 2013. Novelli has explored what makes startups, spin-outs and small and medium enterprises successful. She has conducted research into the strengths of patents in protecting ideas, and how logic-based approaches to decision making improve the outcomes for entrepreneurs. She demonstrated that the most successful businesses have a “streamÆ of ideas", giving the example of the Apple Watch. The best defence to competitors who exploit the potential of a single product release is to continue innovating: “is there an alternative version of this product that could add more value? Are there other markets where this idea could create value? Are there complementary services or products that we can create around this idea?”.

Novelli worked with the University of Oxford and Bocconi University to create a training program for microbusinesses. During this program, Strategy Insight Lab, she analysed what enabled the growth and success of these businesses. Strategy Insight Lab was supported by the Department for Business, Energy and Industrial Strategy. She subsequently created Idea Booster Lab, which provided free training for spin-out companies. Novelli has demonstrated that scientific thinking and well-defined business models resulted in immediate gains for startups. More mature business models, the use of the business model canvas and decision-making frameworks, resulted in better application of scientific thinking, resulting in better performance. She argued that entrepreneurs and investors should consider the development stage of a startup before applying systematic approaches.

Novelli teaches Strategic Leadership in the Master of Business Administration program at City University. She launched an elective Capturing Value from Innovation, which is currently taught to students across all business school programs.

== Awards and honours ==
- 2021 Academy of Management STR Distinguished Paper Award for Knowledge, Innovation, and Strategic Human Capital
- 2021 DRUID Best Paper Prize
- 2021 Strategic Management Society Best Paper Prize

== Selected papers ==
- Ahuja, Gautam; Lampert, Curba Morris; Novelli, Elena (2013). "The Second Face of Appropriability: Generative Appropriability and Its Determinants". Academy of Management Review. 38 (2): 248–269. doi:10.5465/amr.2010.0290. ISSN 0363-7425.
- Ahuja, Gautam; Novelli, Elena (2017). "Redirecting Research Efforts on the Diversification–Performance Linkage: The Search for Synergy". Academy of Management Annals. 11 (1): 342–390. doi:10.5465/annals.2014.0079. ISSN 1941-6520.
- Novelli, Elena (2015-03-01). "An examination of the antecedents and implications of patent scope". Research Policy. 44 (2): 493–507. doi:10.1016/j.respol.2014.09.005. ISSN 0048-7333.
