= Elena Naperotić =

Croatian singer-songwriter

lennie
- Born: Elena Naperotić; October 19, 2001 (age 24); Pula, Croatia
- Genres: Pop, contemporary R&B
- Occupations: Singer, songwriter, dancer
- Instruments: Vocals, piano
- Years active: 2009–present
- Labels: Croatia Records, MIXGY Music Group

Elena Naperotić (born 19 October 2001), known by her stage name lennie, is a Croatian singer, songwriter, and dancer. She came to prominence in 2011 as the performer of the first single from the album "Traži se prijatelj" which is dedicated to all victims of violence in Croatia.

== Early life ==
Naperotić was born on 19 October 2001 in Pula to a Catholic family and spent the majority of her childhood in Tar. She displayed interest in music and performance from an early age. At the age of 5, she had already started training dance in a summer camp, and in the 1st grade, she joined the dance club USB Poreč. During her high-school education, she often spent weekends in Poreč, and during the week in Italy, where she attended art gymnasium.

== Career ==
She gradually started her career by participating in various music festivals from an early age. In 2010, she won the award for the best performer under 10 years of age at the children's festival "Mali Veliki Mikrofon".

In 2011, Croatia Records released the album "Traži se prijatelj". The sound carrier, dedicated to Luka Ritz, Aleksandar Abramov, Vitomir Jovičić and all victims of violence in Croatia, was created on the initiative of Arijana Kunštek, and Ines Prajo, who are also the authors of the music and all the lyrics on the CD, while the songs are about the power of true friendship, love, tolerance, mutual respect, but also violence as a negative consequence of today's society. First single from the album was performed by Elena Naperotić and popular radio presenter Zlatko Turkalj. "Traži se prijatelj", the title of the first single, was released with a promotional music video. In 2012, the album was nominated in the category for the best album for children at the 19th edition of Porin Music Awards Ceremony.

In 2021, she signed up for Supertalent Croatia and automatically gained the attention of a larger audience. She released her first independent single called "Ti Me Razumiješ" (You Understand Me) the following year, and it instantly became a hit of the week.

== Discography ==
=== Albums ===
Title	Details
Traži se prijatelj	Various Artists: Released: 2011; Label: Croatia Records; Formats: CD, digital download, streaming
Dječji Festival Kukuriček 2012	Various Artists: Released: 2012; Label: Croatia Records; Formats: CD, digital download, streaming

=== Singles ===
Title	Year	Album
"Aman" (Cover)	2022	non-album singles
"Ti Me Razumiješ"	2022	non-album singles
"We Found Love (lennie's version)"	2022	non-album singles
"daj mi vremena"	2022	non-album singles
"Desna Strana Knjige"	2023	non-album singles
