= Alenka =

Alenka is a popular Slovene female given name. It ranks among the top 30 most common female names in Slovenia. Another version of the same name is Lenka. In Slavic languages, both versions are often treated as diminutive names of Alena and Lena, respectively.

The name may refer to:

- Alenka Bernot, Yugoslav/Slovenian slalom canoeist who competed in the early 1960s
- Alenka Bikar (born 1974), Slovenian former sprinter who specializes in the 200 metres
- Alenka Bratušek (born 1970), Slovenian Prime Minister
- Alenka Čebašek (born 1989), Slovenian cross-country skier
- Alenka Cuderman (born 1961), former Yugoslav/Slovenian handball player who competed in the 1984 Summer Olympics
- Alenka Dovžan (born 1976), retired Slovenian alpine skier
- Alenka Godec (born 1964), Slovenian jazz and pop singers
- Alenka Gotar (born 1977), Slovene soprano singer
- Alenka Kejžar (born 1979), Olympic class swimmer
- Alenka Kham Pičman (1932–2025), Slovenian architect, painter, graphic artist, and industrial designer
- Alenka Puhar (born 1945), Slovenian journalist, author, translator, and historian
- Alenka Sottler (born 1958), Slovene painter and illustrator
- Alenka Zupančič (born 1966), Slovenian philosopher whose work focuses on psychoanalysis and continental philosophy
