= Elena Forbes =

English writer

Elena Forbes is an English writer of crime fiction. The protagonist of her novels so far is Detective Inspector Mark Tartaglia of the Barnes Murder Squad. Her first novel was shortlisted for the John Creasey (New Blood) Dagger Award.

== Biography ==
Elena Forbes was born and brought up in London. After studying Modern Languages (French and Italian) at Bristol University, she worked in portfolio management before becoming a full-time writer. Forbes lives in Notting Hill, London with her husband and two children.

=== Mark Tartaglia ===
- Die With Me (2007)
- Our Lady of Pain (2008)
- Evil in Return (2010)
- Jigsaw Man (2015)

=== Eve West ===
- A Bad, Bad Thing (2018)
