= Elena Di Girolamo =

Argentine politician

National Senator
- In office 1952–1955
- Constituency: Corrientes

Elena Di Girolamo was an Argentine politician. She was elected to the Senate in 1951 as one of the first group of female parliamentarians in Argentina.

In the 1951 legislative elections Di Girolamo was a Peronist Party candidate and one of six women elected to the Senate. Representing Corrientes, she became secretary of the Public Works Committee and also sat on the General Legislation and Technical Matters Committee. She remained in office until 1955.
