= Elena Botchorichvili =

Georgian-Canadian writer

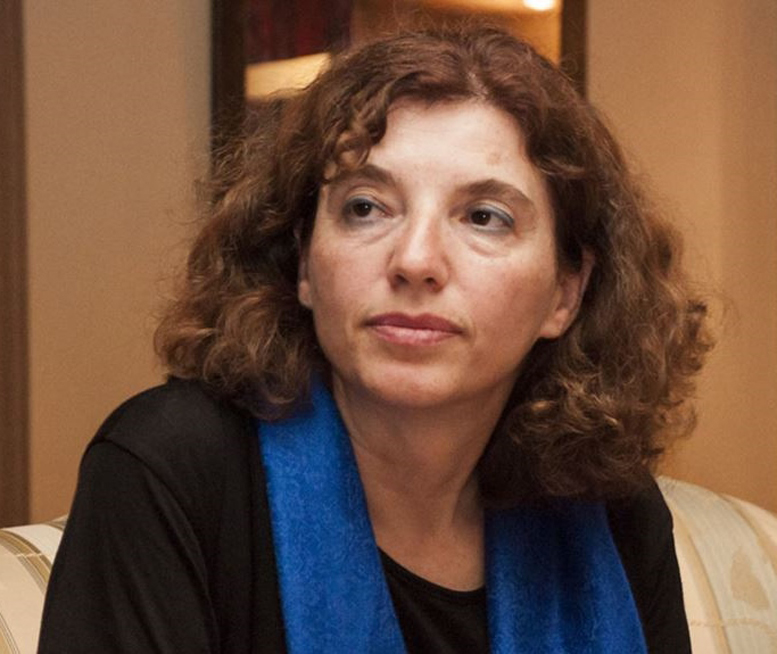
- Elena Bochorishvili in 2016
- Born: ელენე ბოჭორიშვილი January 11, 1966 (age 60); Tbilisi, Georgia
- Occupations: writer, journalist
- Notable work: Magic Ointment, My Father's Head, Just Wait and Watch

Elena Botchorichvili (Georgian: ელენე ბოჭორიშვილი) is a Georgian-Canadian writer and journalist who writes in Russian.

== Early life and education ==
Bacharyshvili was born on January 11, 1966, in Tbilisi, Georgia, in a family of scholars. She began her career in journalism at the age of 13. She graduated from the Faculty of Journalism at Tbilisi State University. Initially, she worked as a sports journalist and wrote scripts for documentary films. Bacharyshvili was the first in the Soviet Union to write about baseball and became the first female journalist to represent the Sovetsky Sport newspaper abroad.

In 1992, she moved to Canada on an invitation and met her future husband, sports journalist Richard Chartier, who worked for the La Presse newspaper. They had a son, George, in 2001.

== Literary career ==
Bacharyshvili's first novella, Light Rain (1997), marked the beginning of her literary career. She is credited with introducing a new genre of novel known as the "novel in stenogram," a form that combines narrative with direct speech and factual reports.

In 1999, her novella Light Rain was translated into French by Éditions du Boréal under the title "The Box for the Butterfly". Other works published in French by the same publisher include Opera (2002), Faina (2006), Magic Oinment (2008), My Father's Head (2011), and Just Wait and Watch (2012).

In 2012, Bacharyshvili's novella Magic Ointment (Sauvki in Russian) was published in Novy Mir, a prestigious Russian literary journal. Later that year, Corpus publishing released her collection of stories My Father’s Head, which featured five novellas about Georgia in the 20th century. Russian writer Vladimir Sorokin praised Bacharyshvili, calling her a notable contemporary writer under the age of forty.

In early 2015, Corpus released another collection titled Just Wait and Watch, which included four previously unpublished works and three stories that had already been released in Russian. Bacharyshvili's novella Opera was performed on stage at the Tsaritsyn Opera Theatre in Volgograd.

Bochorishvili's works have been translated into French, Italian, Czech, Romanian, Polish, Portuguese, and Georgian. In 2010, the novella Opera was published in Georgian, and in 2016, a collection titled Stenographic Novels was released, featuring the novellas My Fragrant Uncles and Scented Grandmothers, My Father's Head, and Sauvki.

== Bibliography ==
- Magic Ointment (Елена Бочоришвили. Волшебная мазь) – Novy Mir, 2012, №2.
- My Father's Head (Елена Бочоришвили. Голова моего отца) – Corpus, 2012, 288 pages, ISBN 978-5-271-41162-5.
- Just Wait and Watch (Елена Бочоришвили. Только ждать и смотреть) – Corpus, 2015, 416 pages, ISBN 978-5-17-087702-7.

== Awards ==
In 2015 Elena Bochorishvili was awarded the Russian Prize for her short story collection Just Wait and Watch.
