= Elena Lander =

Russian actress and TV presenter

- Елена Ландер
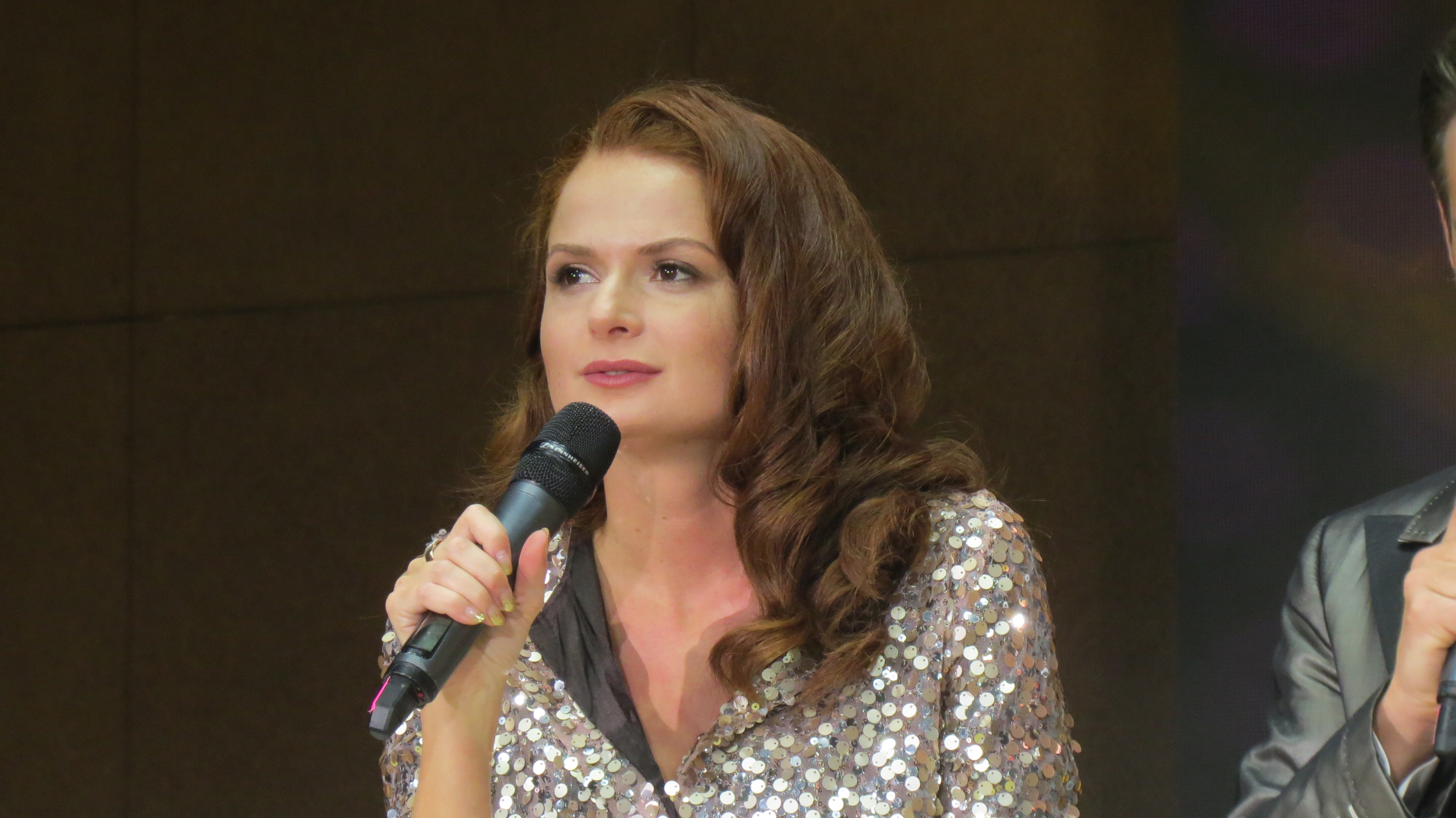
- Born: 27 September 1985 (age 40); Moscow, RSFSR, USSR
- Education: Derzhavin International Slavic Institute
- Years active: 2006 — present

Elena Vladimirovna Lander (Russian: Елена Владимировна Ландер; born 27 September 1985 in Moscow, USSR) is a Russian theatre and cinema actress and TV presenter. Since 27 November 2014 she has hosted the Russian breakfast TV programme Morning of Russia on Russia-1.

== Biography ==
She was born on 27 September 1985 in Moscow into a theatrical family (father — director and teacher Vladimir Baikher). She graduated from music school in harp class.

In 2006 she graduated from the Acting Department of the Derzhavin International Slavic Institute (artistic directors — Lyudmila Ivanova and Vladimir Baikher).

Being a second-year student she made her debut on the stage of the children's musical theater Impromptu Theater under the direction of Lyudmila Ivanova in the play Mama by Gogol's works. Since 2006 — actress of the Impromptu Theater. Since 2007 — the actress of the Melikhovsky Theater Chekhov Studio under the direction of Vladimir Baikher. She played roles in movies and television series.

Since 2013 — the leader of news releases on the Israel Plus in Israel. November 27, 2014 was the leading morning program Morning of Russia on the channel Russia-1, replacing Irina Muromtseva. Worked in tandem with Vladislav Zavyalov and with Andrei Petrov. In 2017, she was nominated for the TEFI Award in the category Daily Ether in the nomination Morning Program.
