= Elena Donati =

Italian swimmer (born 1974)

Personal information
- Born: 26 January 1974 (age 52)

Sport
- Sport: Swimming

Elena Donati (born 26 January 1974) is an Italian breaststroke swimmer. She competed in two events at the 1992 Summer Olympics.
