= Elena Stonaker =

American fine artist and designer (born 1985)

- Born: June 16, 1985 (age 40)
- Style: Sculpture, Wearable Art, Fashion, Costume Design, painting, Animation
- Website: elenastonaker.com

Elena Stonaker is an American fine artist and designer who lives and works in Los Angeles. She is known for her intricate textile work and soft sculpture installations created upon myth-based narratives.
