= Elena Fomicheva =

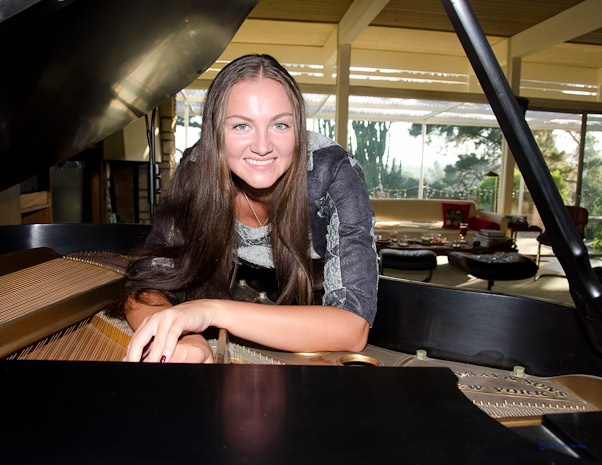
- Elena Fomicheva (Los Angeles, 2011)

Background information
- Born: April 11, 1987 (age 38); Leningrad, Russian SFSR, Soviet Union (now Saint Petersburg, Russia)
- Genres: classical
- Occupation: Performance artist
- Instrument: piano
- Years active: 2004–present

Elena Fomicheva (born April 11, 1987) is a classical pianist, soloist and accompanist.

== Early life and education ==
Elena Fomicheva was born in Russia. She started her piano studies at age six in Saint Petersburg. In 2006, she graduated with a bachelor's degree from Modest Mussorgsky College of Music. Six years later, she received an Artist Diploma in Piano Performance from Rimsky-Korsakov State Conservatory in Saint Petersburg. In 2012, she relocated to Boston, Massachusetts, US, where she graduated from New England Conservatory of Music with a Master of Music degree in 2014.

== Career ==
Among her noted performances are her 2005 tour with the St. Petersburg Students Orchestra throughout Europe, performing as a soloist and with the Orchestra in Finland, Sweden, Denmark, Germany and winning the First. She held a three months long series of soloist at gala concerts in Egypt in 2009; highly acclaimed recitals with the noted American pianist/violinist Ayke Agus (a former Jascha Heifetz assistant) in Los Angeles in 2010; a recital by special invitation at the 2011 Jascha Heifetz documentary premiere God's Fiddler at the House of Composers, St. Petersburg, Russia; in Vilnius, Lithiuania; and in New York with Ayke Agus Following the success of these latter recitals, Fomicheva was invited by Agus to form a permanent duo for concerts throughout Europe and the US, performing interpretations of Heifetz's transcriptions for violin and piano.

Fomicheva's artistic activity includes appearances in such well-known venues as Glazunov Hall and Glinka Capella in Saint Petersburg, Rudolfinum Concert Hall in Prague, Mozarteum University in Salzburg, Philharmonic Hall in Vilnius, Merkin Hall, Steinway Hall in New York City, and Jordan Hall in Boston, among others. She participated in master classes with Graham Johnson, Craig Rutenberg, Allan Smith, Ayke Agus, Richard Goode, Alexander Braginsky, Glenn Dicterow, Baruch Meir, Boris Slutsky, Marian Hann and Ulrich Eisenlohr.

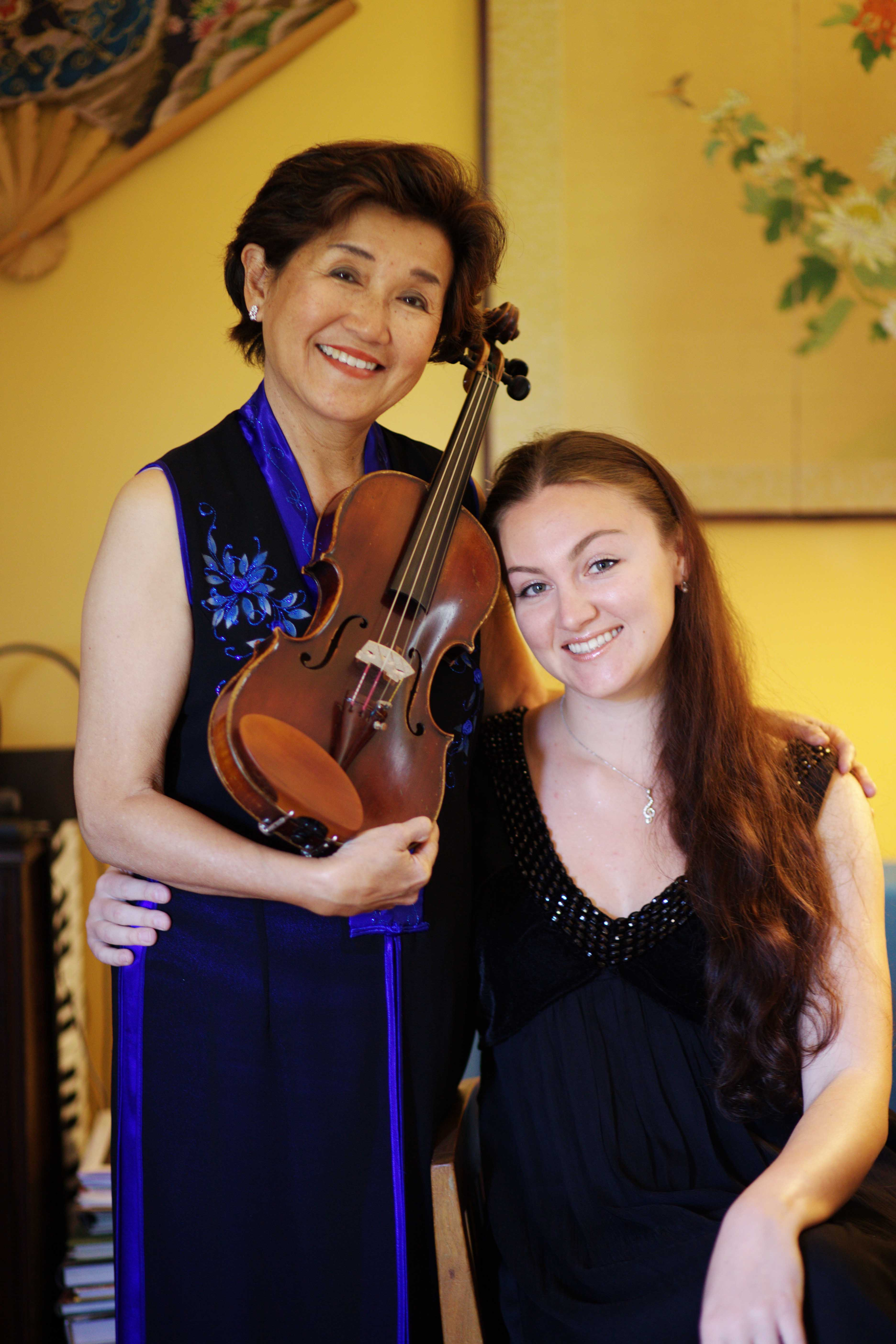
Elena Fomicheva with Ayke Agus (February 10, 2010)

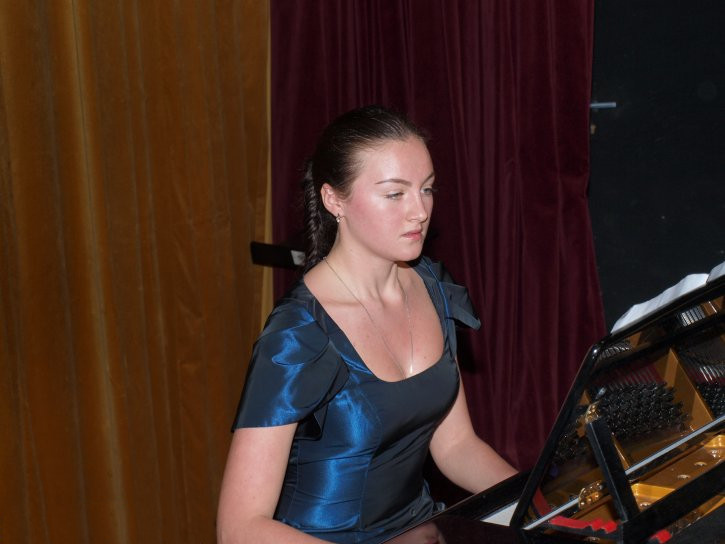
Elena Fomicheva (Prague, 2010)

== Honors and awards ==
- 2006 First Prize in Collaborative Arts Competition at the Mussorgsky Music College
- 2010 Grand Prix for the best soloist with orchestra of Russian Folk Instruments "The Carousel Orchestra" in Prague
- Awards at various competitions for young talents in Gatchina, Tikhvin, St. Petersburg, Moscow, Russia and Narva, Estonia.
- 2014 Marc and Eva Stern Tuition Fellowship at SongFest at Colburn School of Music in Los Angeles, California
- 2014 Outstanding Collaborative Pianist Award at the 43rd American Institute of Musical Studies (AIMS) Vocal and Piano Institute in Graz, Austria

== Personal life ==
Fomicheva resides in Miami, Florida.
