= Elena Osokina =

Russian historian (born 1959)

Elena Aleksandrovna Osokina (born 1959 in Podolsk, Soviet Union) is a Soviet and Russian historian, doctor of Historical Sciences, professor of Russian and Soviet History at the University of South Carolina.

== Education and work ==
Elena Aleksandrovna Osokina earned her B.A. and M.A. in 1981, and her Ph.D. in 1987, all from Moscow State University.

Osokina's first book, "Hierarchy of Consumption: Life Under the Stalinist Rationing System, 1928-1935" was released in 1993 in Russia.

In 1998, ROSSPEN published her second book "За фасадом «сталинского изобилия»: Распределение и рынок в снабжении населения в годы индустриализации, 1927-1941". In 2001, M.E. Sharpe Publisher translated this book into English and published it under the title "Our Daily Bread: Socialist Distribution and the Art of Survival in Stalin’s Russia, 1927-1941".

Elena Osokina's third book "Gold for Industrialization: Torgsin" came out in 2009 in Russia. The book explores the history of Soviet industrialization and everyday life, focusing on the role of the state stores, Torgsin (1931–36), which during the lean years of Stalin’s industrialization sold food and goods to the Soviet people at inflated prices in exchange for foreign currency, gold, silver and diamonds. Torgsin became an important source of gold for Stalin to finance industrialization and the major strategy for survival for people during those harsh times. The study enriches understanding of Stalinism, the workings of the Soviet economy, the nature of Soviet everyday life and consumerism.

Since 2012, Elena Osokina is professor of Russian history at the University of South Carolina.
