= Eleni (given name) =

- Pronunciation: eh-LEN-nee is traditional Greek pronunciation
- Gender: Female

Other names
- Related names: Helen, Helene, Elaine

Eleni is a feminine given name of Greek origin. It is a phonetic spelling of the Modern Greek name "Ελένη", whose ancient version, Ἑλένη, is anglicized as Helen. Popular diminutives and nicknames include: Elenitsa, Elenaki, Elena, Lena, Lenio, Lenners, Nitsa.

Eleni may refer to:

== People ==
- Eleni of Ethiopia (died 1522), Ethiopian empress
- Eleni Aklillu, Ethiopian senior scientific researcher
- Eleni Andriola (born 1986), Greek gymnast
- Eleni Antoniadou, Greek public figure
- Eleni Artymata (born 1986), Greek sprinter
- Eleni Avlonitou (born 1958), Greek swimmer
- Eleni Bakopanos (born 1954), Greek-born Canadian politician
- Eleni Benson (born 1983), Greek footballer
- Eleni Boukoura-Altamoura (1821–1900), Greek painter
- Eleni Chatzi (born 1981), Greek civil engineer
- Eleni Chatziliadou (born 1993), Greek karateka
- Eleni Christofi (born 1998), Greek tennis player
- Eleni Cubitt, Greek-born British film maker
- Eleni Daniilidou (born 1982), Greek tennis player
- Eleni Diamanti, Greek engineer and researcher
- Eleni Doika (born 1995), Greek gymnast
- Eleni Donta (born 1980), Greek marathon runner
- Eleni Epstein (1925–1991), American former newspaper
- Eleni Evangel (born 1965), Australian politician
- Eleni Fotiadou Küreman (1921–2001), Turkish photojournalist of Greek ethnicity
- Eleni Foureira (born 1987), Greek singer and fashion designer
- Eleni Gabre-Madhin (born 1964), Ethiopian economist
- Eleni Gebrehiwot (born 1984), German long-distance runner
- Eleni Georgiou (born 1985), Greek synchronized swimmer
- Eleni Giannou (born 1993), Cypriot footballer
- Eleni Goula (born 1990), Greek water polo player
- Eleni Ioannou (1984–2004), Greek judoka
- Eleni Kakambouki (born 1987), Greek footballer
- Eleni Kapogianni (born 1969), Greek basketball coach
- Eleni Karaindrou (born 1941), Greek composer
- Eleni Karinte, first love of Mustafa Kemal Atatürk
- Eleni Karpeta, (1937–2025), Greek actress
- Eleni Kavros DeGraw, American politician
- Eleni Kelaiditi (born 2000), Greek rhythmic gymnast
- Eleni Kiosi (born 1985), Greek volleyball player
- Eleni Klapanara (born 1973), Greek cyclist
- Eleni Kordolaimi (born 1993), Greek tennis player
- Eleni Konsolaki, Greek archaeologist
- Eleni Kosti (born 1985), Greek swimmer
- Eleni Kouvdou (born 1989), Greek water polo player
- Eleni Kyriacou (born 1980), Greek Cypriot fashion designer
- Eleni Lambiri (1882–1960), Greek conductor and composer
- Eleni Louka (born 2001), Cypriot tennis player
- Eleni Mandell (born 1969), American singer-songwriter
- Eleni Markou (born 1995), Greek footballer
- Eleni Mavrou (born 1961), Greek Cypriot politician
- Eleni Memetzi (born 1975), Greek volleyball player
- Eleni Menegaki (born 1969), Greek talk show presenter
- Eleni Mylonas (born 1944), Greek-born American artist
- Eleni Nastouli, Greek virologist
- Eleni Ourani (1896–1971), Greek writer
- Eleni Papadaki (1903–1944), Greek stage actress
- Eleni Papastamatopoulou (born 2002), Greek para taekwondo practitioner
- Eleni Paschalidou-Zongolopoulou (1909–1991), Greek artist
- Eleni Patsiou (born 1971), Greek judoka
- Eleni Peletidou (born 1980), Greek footballer
- Eleni Petinos, Australian politician
- Eleni Poimenidou (born 1980), Greek handball player
- Eleni Potari (1982–2023), Greek handball player
- Eleni Prelorentzou (born 1968), Greek paracanoeist
- Eleni Rantou (born 1963), Greek actress
- Eleni Rossides (born 1967), American tennis player
- Eleni M. Roumel (born 1974), American judge
- Eleni Saich (born 2001), Greek footballer
- Eleni Sikelianos (born 1965), American poet
- Eleni Skoura (1896-1991), Greek politician
- Eleni Stavridou (born 1973), Greek diver
- Eleni Stavrou (born 1975), Cypriot politician
- Eleni Stroulia, Greek-Canadian computer scientist
- Eleni Tampasi (born 1976), Greek judoka
- Eleni Tee, Australian rules football umpire
- Eleni Teloni (born 1964), Cypriot hammer thrower
- Eleni Theocharous (born 1953), Cypriot politician and surgeon
- Eleni Tositsa (c. 1796–1866), Greek archaeologist
- Eleni Tsakopoulos Kounalakis (born 1966), diplomat and 50th Lieutenant Governor of California
- Eleni Tsaligopoulou (born 1963), Greek singer
- Eleni Tzoka (born 1956), Polish singer
- Eleni Vakalo (1921-2001), Greek poet, art critic and art historian
- Eleni Vasileiou (born 1974), Greek basketball player
- Eleni Vitali (born 1954), Greek singer
- Eleni Xenaki (born 1997), Greek water polo player
- Eleni Zafeiriou (1916–2004), Greek film actress
- Eleni Zaroulia (born 1961), Greek politician

== Songs about Eleni ==
- "Anoixe Lenio tin porta" (Lenio open the door, Greek: Άνοιξε Λενιώ την πόρτα), traditional
- "Eleni" by Thanos Mikroutsikos and Babis Tsikliropoulos, originally sung by Haris Alexiou
- "Fevgo, Lenio" (Lenio, I'm leaving, Greek: Φεύγω, Λενιώ) by Spyros Peristeris and Minos Matsas
- "I Eleni i zontochira" (Divorcee Eleni, Greek: Η Ελένη η ζωντοχήρα) by Iovan Tsaous, originally sung by Antonis Kalyvopoulos
- "I Lenio i koutsobola" (Nosy Lenio, Greek: Η Λενιώ η κουτσομπόλα) by Michalis Genitsaris
- "Nitsa-Elenitsa" (Greek: Νίτσα-Ελενίτσα) by Giorgos Mitsakis, originally sung by Stelios Kazantzidis
- "To tango tis Elenis" (Eleni's tango, Greek: Το τανγκό της Ελένης) by Antonis Vardis and Vasilis Papakonstantinou
- "Eleni" by Nikos Karvelas, originally sung by Anna Vissi - later covered by Turkish pop folk singer Hülya Avşar as "Sevdim"
- "Eleni" by Dutch Tol & Tol, based on a book by Nicholas Gage, sung, among others, by Demis Roussos

== See also ==
- Elaine (disambiguation)
- Elena (disambiguation)
- Eleni (disambiguation)
- Ellen (disambiguation)
- Helen (disambiguation)
- Helen (given name)
- Helena (disambiguation)
- Helene (disambiguation)
