= Julien Clerc discography =

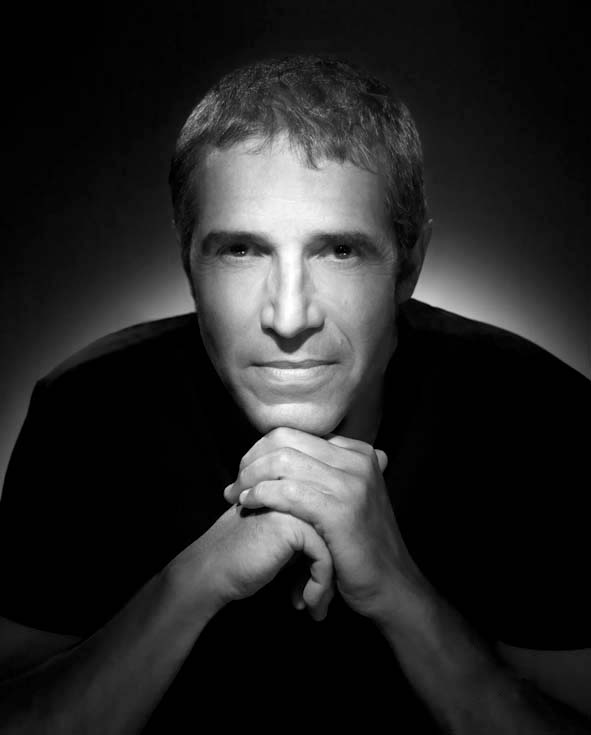
- Julien Clerc in 2008.
- Studio albums: 28
- Live albums: 12
- Compilation albums: 10
- Singles: 85
- Box sets: 9

The discography of French singer-songwriter Julien Clerc consists of 28 studio albums, 12 live albums, 10 compilation albums, nine box sets and 85 singles.

== Albums ==
=== Studio albums ===
Title	Album details	Peak chart positions						Certifications
Title	Album details	FRA	BE (FL)	BE (WA)	CAN (QUE)	NL	SWI	Certifications
Julien Clerc (aka La cavalerie)	Released: March 1969; Label: Odeon; Formats: LP	1	—	—	—	—	—	
Des jours entiers à t'aimer	Released: May 1970; Label: Pathé; Formats: LP	—	—	—	—	—	—	
Julien Clerc (aka Niagara)	Released: November 1971; Label: Pathé; Formats: LP	1	—	—	—	—	—	FRA: Gold
Liberté, égalité, fraternité... ou la mort	Released: 1972; Label: Pathé; Formats: LP, MC	4	—	—	—	—	—	FRA: Gold
Julien (aka Ça fait pleurer le bon dieu)	Released: August 1973; Label: Pathé; Formats: LP, MC	1	—	—	5	—	—	FRA: Gold
Terre de France	Released: October 1974; Label: Pathé; Formats: LP, MC	7	—	—	—	—	—	FRA: Gold
N°7	Released: November 1975; Label: Pathé; Formats: LP, MC	1	—	—	—	1	—	FRA: Gold
À mon âge et à l'heure qu'il est	Released: December 1976; Label: Pathé; Formats: LP, MC	1	—	—	—	—	—	FRA: Gold
Jaloux	Released: April 1978; Label: Pathé; Formats: LP, MC	1	—	—	3	—	—	FRA: Gold
Clerc Julien	Released: February 1980; Label: Pathé; Formats: LP, MC	5	—	—	—	—	—	FRA: Gold
Sans entracte	Released: October 1980; Label: Pathé; Formats: LP, MC	1	—	—	—	—	—	FRA: Gold
Femmes, indiscrétion, blasphème	Released: April 1982; Label: Virgin; Formats: LP, MC	2	—	—	37	—	—	FRA: Platinum
Aime-moi	Released: November 1984; Label: Virgin; Formats: LP, MC	2	—	—	11	—	—	FRA: Platinum
Les aventures à l'eau	Released: February 1987; Label: Virgin; Formats: CD, LP, MC	3	—	—	27	32	—	FRA: Platinum
Fais-moi une place	Released: 8 January 1990; Label: Virgin; Formats: CD, LP, MC	2	—	—	—	—	—	FRA: Platinum
Utile	Released: 8 December 1992; Label: Virgin; Formats: CD, LP, MC	8	—	—	15	99	—	FRA: Platinum
Julien	Released: 25 March 1997; Label: Virgin; Formats: CD, MC, MD	3	—	3	29	—	—	FRA: Platinum
Si j'étais elle	Released: 14 November 2000; Label: Virgin; Formats: CD, MC	1	—	7	—	—	50	FRA: Platinum; BE: Gold
Studio	Released: 19 May 2003; Label: Virgin; Formats: CD	4	—	2	—	—	42	FRA: Gold
Double enfance	Released: 3 October 2005; Label: Virgin; Formats: CD	1	—	2	63	86	26	FRA: 2×Platinum; BE: Gold
Où s'en vont les avions ?	Released: 15 September 2008; Label: Virgin; Formats: CD	1	55	1	41	—	11	FRA: 3×Platinum; BE: Gold
Fou, peut-être	Released: 7 November 2011; Label: EMI; Formats: CD, digital download	2	67	1	—	—	32	FRA: 2×Platinum; BE: Gold
Partout la musique vient	Released: 31 October 2014; Label: Parlophone; Formats: CD, digital download	1	100	2	—	—	34	FRA: Platinum
À nos amours	Released: 20 October 2017; Label: Parlophone; Formats: CD, 2×CD, 2×LP, digital download	6	93	4	—	169	16	FRA: Platinum
Duos	Released: 22 November 2019; Label: Parlophone; Formats: CD, LP, digital download	14	121	6	—	—	14	FRA: Gold
Terrien	Released: 12 February 2021; Label: Play Two; Formats: CD, LP, digital download	1	—	1	—	—	15	FRA: Gold
Les jours heureux	Released: 26 November 2021; Label: Play Two; Formats: CD, digital download	34	—	19	—	—	40	
Une vie	Released: 23 May 2025; Label: Parlophone; Formats: CD, LP, digital download	5	—	3	—	—	20	
"—" denotes releases that did not chart or were not released in that territory.

=== Live albums ===
Title	Album details	Peak chart positions			Certifications
Title	Album details	FRA	BE (FL)	BE (WA)	Certifications
Olympia 70	Released: January 1970; Label: Pathé; Formats: LP	3	—	—	
Avec vous à l'Olympia	Released: 1974; Label: Pathé; Formats: 2×LP, MC	—	—	—	
Enregistrement public au Palais des sports	Released: 1977; Label: Pathé; Formats: 3×LP, 2×MC	1	—	—	
Vendredi 13	Released: 1981; Label: Pathé; Formats: 2×LP, 2×MC	—	—	—	
Pantin 83	Released: August 1983; Label: Pathé; Formats: LP, MC	21	—	—	FRA: Gold
Pour les fous d'hier et d'aujourd'hui	Released: 1988; Label: Virgin; Formats: CD, 2×LP, MC	—	—	—	
Amours secrètes… passion publique	Released: November 1991; Label: Virgin; Formats: CD, 2×LP, MC	19	—	—	FRA: 2×Gold
Olympia intégral 94	Released: 28 February 1994; Label: Virgin; Formats: 2×CD, MC	5	—	—	FRA: Gold
Le 4 octobre	Released: December 1997; Label: Virgin; Formats: CD, MC	33	—	41	FRA: Gold
Julien déménage acoustique et électrique	Released: March 2002; Label: Virgin; Formats: CD, 2×CD, MC	13	—	11	FRA: Gold
Tour 09	Released: 30 November 2009; Label: Virgin; Formats: 2×CD	50	—	43	
Symphonique	Released: 26 November 2012; Label: Virgin; Formats: 2×CD, digital download	24	178	23	
"—" denotes releases that did not chart or were not released in that territory.

=== Compilation albums ===
Title	Album details	Peak chart positions					Certifications
Title	Album details	FRA	BE (FL)	BE (WA)	CAN (QUE)	NL	Certifications
Disque d'or de Julien Clerc	Released: 1972; Label: Pathé; Formats: LP, MC	—	—	—	—	—	
Disque d'or de Julien Clerc vol. 2	Released: 1977; Label: Pathé; Formats: LP, MC	—	—	—	—	—	
Préférences	Released: November 1985; Label: Virgin; Formats: LP, MC	17	—	—	—	—	FRA: 2×Gold
Ce n'est rien (1968–1990)	Released: January 1994; Label: EMI; Formats: CD, MC	6	—	—	21	42	FRA: Platinum
Si on chantait 1968–1997	Released: March 1998; Label: EMI; Formats: CD, MC	—	—	25	85	—	FRA: 2×Gold
A Rendez-Vous with Julien Clerc	Released: November 1999; Label: Virgin; Formats: CD, MC	—	—	—	—	87	
Het beste van	Released: August 2002; Label: EMI; Formats: CD	—	—	—	—	90	
Platinum Collection	Released: March 2004; Label: Virgin; Formats: 3×CD	—	—	7	—	—	
Best Of – 3CD	Released: 3 April 2009; Label: Virgin; Formats: 3×CD	—	—	63	—	—	
Fans, je vous aime	Released: 18 November 2016; Label: Virgin; Formats: 2×CD, digital download	21	127	6	—	—	FRA: Platinum
"—" denotes releases that did not chart or were not released in that territory.

=== Box sets ===
Title	Album details	Peak chart positions	
Title	Album details	FRA	BE (WA)
Intégrale 68–72	Released: 1993; Label: Virgin; Formats: 4×CD	—	—
Intégrale 77–82	Released: 1993; Label: Virgin; Formats: 4×CD	—	—
Intégrale 83–92	Released: 1993; Label: Virgin; Formats: 4×CD	—	—
100 chansons	Released: 4 December 2006; Label: Virgin; Formats: 4×CD	—	56
Live 74, 77, 81 & 09	Released: 30 November 2009; Label: Virgin; Formats: 7×CD	77	—
Le coffret essentiel	Released: 29 October 2012; Label: EMI; Formats: 13×CD	—	—
5 albums originaux	Released: 11 August 2014; Label: Warner Music; Formats: 5×CD	—	—
Collection de 14 CD singles	Released: 2017; Label: Warner; Formats: 14×CDS	—	—
Anthologie	Released: 19 October 2018; Label: Parlophone; Formats: 26×CD	—	59
"—" denotes releases that did not chart or were not released in that territory.

== Singles ==
Title	Year	Peak chart positions					Album
Title	Year	FRA	BE (FL)	BE (WA)	CAN (QUE)	NL	Album
L'amour en chantier	1968	—	—	23	—	—	Julien Clerc (1969)
Sur tes pas	1968	—	—	27	—	—	Julien Clerc (1969)
Yann et les dauphins	1969	—	—	38	—	—	Julien Clerc (1969)
"Si tu reviens" / "La Californie"	1969	— 9	—	22	—	—	Des jours entiers à t'aimer
"Manchester, England"	1969	—	—	—	—	—	Hair (French cast recording)
"Laissons entrer le soleil"	1969	10	—	25	—	—	Hair (French cast recording)
"Carthage"	1969	9	—	26	—	—	Des jours entiers à t'aimer
"Des jours entiers à t'aimer"	1970	15	—	24	—	—	Des jours entiers à t'aimer
"4 heures du matin"	1970	—	—	27	—	—	Des jours entiers à t'aimer
"Les fleurs des gares"	1970	10	—	21	—	—	Non-album singles
"Le cœur volcan"	1971	—	—	19	—	—	Non-album singles
"Cris, tambours et masques de guerre" / "Berce-moi"	1971	—	—	— 24	—	—	Non-album singles
"Ce n'est rien"	1971	4	—	4	—	23	Julien Clerc (1971)
"Niagara"	1972	—	—	19	—	—	Julien Clerc (1971)
"À chaque jour"	1972	17	—	14	—	—	Non-album single
"Si on chantait"	1972	10	—	4	—	9	Liberté, égalité, fraternité... ou la mort
"Ça fait pleurer le bon Dieu"	1973	—	—	9	—	—	Julien (1973)
"Je sais que c'est elle"	1973	—	—	—	13	—	Julien (1973)
"Danse s'y"	1974	—	—	11	—	—	Terre de France
"Ballade pour un fou (loco, loco)"	1975	—	—	24	—	—	Non-album single
"Heureux le marin qui nage" (Netherlands-only release)	1975	—	—	—	—	—	Julien
"Elle voulait qu'on l'appelle Venise"	1975	—	26	6	—	9	N°7
"This Melody"	1976	—	3	3	8	1	N°7
"Le cœur trop grand pour moi"	1976	20	—	8	—	—	À mon âge et à l'heure qu'il est
"Romina" (Benelux and Germany-only release)	1977	—	—	28	—	—	À mon âge et à l'heure qu'il est
"Partir"	1977	—	—	19	—	—	Non-album single
"Le cœur nu" (Germany and Canada-only release)	1978	—	—	—	—	—	Jaloux
"Ma préférence" / "Travailler c'est trop dur"	1978	— 15	—	—	— 1	37	Jaloux
"Jaloux de tout" (Nertherlands and Canada-only release)	1978	—	—	—	22	—	Jaloux
"Macumba"	1979	—	—	—	—	—	Jaloux
"Ça commence comme un rêve d'enfant"	1979	—	—	—	—	—	Front Populaire 36
"Bibliotheque Mazarine" (Nertherlands-only release)	1980	—	—	—	—	—	Clerc Julien
"Le bonheur" (Canada-only release)	1980	—	—	—	—	—	Front Populaire 36
"Ma doudou"	1980	—	—	—	—	—	Clerc Julien
"Les oiseaux dans les arbres" (Canada-only release)	1980	—	—	—	2	—	Clerc Julien
"Chanson d'Émilie Jolie et du grand oiseau"	1980	—	—	—	4	—	Émilie Jolie
"Mangos"	1981	—	—	—	3	—	Sans entracte
"Femmes... je vous aime" / "À son cou, à ses genoux"	1982	—	—	—	11; 16	—	Femmes, indiscrétion, blasphème
"Lili voulait aller danser"	1982	9	—	—	—	—	Femmes, indiscrétion, blasphème
"Moi j'te connais comm'si j't'avais défaite" (Canada-only release)	1983	—	—	—	19	—	Femmes, indiscrétion, blasphème
"Cœur de rocker"	1983	3	—	—	1	—	Non-album single
"La fille aux bas nylon"	1984	18	—	—	1	—	Aime-moi
"Mélissa"	1985	2	—	—	8	—	Aime-moi
"Bambou bar"	1985	—	—	—	49	—	Aime-moi
"Respire"	1985	—	—	—	35	—	Aime-moi
"Mon ange"	1987	—	—	—	5	—	Les aventures à l'eau
"Hélène"	1987	11	2	—	2	8	Les aventures à l'eau
"L'enfant au walkman"	1987	—	—	—	16	—	Les aventures à l'eau
"Les aventures à l'eau"	1988	—	—	—	—	—	Les aventures à l'eau
"Fais-moi une place"	1990	8	43	—	33	—	Fais-moi une place
"Fille de feu"	1990	—	—	—	39	—	Fais-moi une place
"Petits pois lardons"	1990	—	—	—	—	—	Fais-moi une place
"Nouveau Big Bang"	1990	—	—	—	—	—	Fais-moi une place
"Le verrou"	1991	—	—	—	—	—	Fais-moi une place
"Quitter l'enfance" (live)	1991	—	—	—	—	—	Amours secrètes… passion publique
"Utile"	1992	112	—	—	16	—	Utile
"Noé"	1993	—	—	—	9	—	Utile
"Free Demo"	1993	—	—	—	6	—	Utile
"La belle est arrivée" (live)	1994	42	—	—	20	—	Olympia intégral 94
"Ballade en blanc" (live)	1994	—	—	—	—	—	Olympia intégral 94
"Ce n'est rien" (live)	1994	—	—	—	—	—	Olympia intégral 94
"Seule au monde" (live; Canada-only release)	1994	—	—	—	26	—	Olympia intégral 94
"Amazone, à la vie" (live)	1994	—	—	—	—	—	Olympia intégral 94
"Assez... assez"	1997	42	—	—	4	—	Julien (1987)
"Le phare des vagabondes"	1998	38	—	—	—	—	Julien (1987)
"On serait seuls au monde"	2001	60	—	—	—	—	Si j'étais elle
"Quelques mots en ton nom" (with Assia)	2001	35	—	—	—	—	Si j'étais elle
"Avant qu'on aille au fond des choses"	2003	—	—	—	—	—	Studio
"Qu'est-ce que tu crois ?" (with Carla Bruni)	2003	—	—	—	—	—	Studio
"Double enfance"	2005	—	—	—	—	—	Double enfance
"Quel jeu elle joue"	2006	41	—	—	—	—	Double enfance
"Une vie de rien"	2006	—	—	—	—	—	Double enfance
"Één melodie (This Melody)" (with Rob de Nijs)	2007	—	—	—	—	88	Chansons (by Rob de Nijs)
"La jupe en laine"	2008	—	—	20	—	—	Où s'en vont les avions ?
"Sous sa grande ombrelle"	2008	—	—	—	—	—	Où s'en vont les avions ?
"Où s'en vont les avions ?" (live)	2009	—	—	—	—	—	Tour 09
"Hôtel des caravelles"	2011	98	—	41	—	—	Fou, peut-être
"Jivaro Song" (live)	2012	—	—	—	—	—	Symphonique
"On ne se méfie jamais assez"	2014	88	—	—	—	—	Partout la musique vient
"Entre elle et moi"	2016	166	—	—	—	—	Fans, je vous aime
"Je t'aime etc"	2017	—	—	—	—	—	À nos amours
"On attendait Noël"	2017	—	—	—	—	—	À nos amours
"Ce n'est rien" (with Zaz)	2019	—	—	—	—	—	Duos
"Mon refuge"	2020	—	—	—	—	—	Terrien
"L'assassin assassiné" (live)	2025	—	—	—	—	—	Non-album single
"—" denotes releases that did not chart or were not released in that territory.
