= Lake Helen =

Lake Helen or Helen Lake may refer to several places:

== United States ==
- Helen Lake, Montana
- Lake Helen, Florida, a city in Florida
- Lake Helen (Portage County, Wisconsin)
- Lake Helen (Wyoming), a lake in the Big Horn Mountains
- Lake Helen (California), a lake in Northern California

== Canada ==
- Helen Lake (Vancouver Island)
- Lake Helen 53A - First Nations reserve in Ontario, located on the namesake Lake Helen (Ontario)

== See also ==
- Helen (disambiguation)
- Lake St. Helen, Michigan
