= Lake Ellen =

Lake Ellen may refer to:

- Lake Ellen (Minnesota)
- Lake Ellen (Wisconsin)

== See also ==
- Lake Ellen Kimberlite
- Lake Ellen Wilson
