= Helena =

Helena may refer to:

== People ==
- Helena (given name), a given name (including a list of people and characters with the name)
- Katri Helena (born 1945), Finnish singer
- Saint Helena (disambiguation), this includes places

== Places ==
=== Greece ===
- Helena (island)

=== Guyana ===
- Helena, Guyana

=== United States ===
- Helena, Alabama
- Helena, Arkansas
  - Battle of Helena, July 4, 1863, during the American Civil War
- Helena, California
- Helena, Georgia
- Helena, Louisiana
- Helena Township, Michigan
- Helena, Huron County, Michigan
- Helena, Marquette County, Michigan
- Helena Township, Minnesota
- Helena, Mississippi
- Helena, Missouri
- Helena, Montana, the capital of Montana
  - Helena National Forest, Montana
  - Helena, Montana micropolitan area
  - Lake Helena, Montana
- Helena, New York
- Helena, Ohio
- Helena, Oklahoma
- Helena, South Carolina
- Helena, Texas
- Helena, Wisconsin

=== Canada ===
- Helena Island (Nunavut)
- Helena Lake, Saskatchewan
- Mount Helena (British Columbia)

=== Australia ===
- Helena River, Western Australia
- Mount Helena, Western Australia, a suburb

== Film and television ==
- Helena (1924 film), a silent German film directed by Manfred Noa
- Helena (telenovela), a 1975 Brazilian telenovela
- Helena, a 2008 Colombian film
- Helena (TV series), a 2012 Czech television sitcom
- Helena, a 2014 Argentine film

== Literature ==
- Helena (Machado de Assis novel), 1876 novel by Machado de Assis
- Helena (Waugh novel), 1950 novel by Evelyn Waugh
- Helena (A Midsummer Night's Dream), a character from William Shakespeare's A Midsummer Night's Dream

== Music ==
- "Helena" (song), a 2004 song by American rock band My Chemical Romance
- "Helena" (Hugo Raspoet song), a 1970 song by Flemish singer Hugo Raspoet
- "Helena", a song by The Misfits from the 1999 album Famous Monsters
- "Helena", a song by Nickel Creek from the 2005 album Why Should the Fire Die?
- "Helena", a song by Will Haven from the 2007 album The Hierophant
- "Helena", a 1972 song by Jack de Nijs
- "Helena", a 1973 song by Leapy Lee
- "Helena", a 1963 instrumental by Ladi Geisler

== Ships ==
- HMS Helena, name of various Royal Navy ships
- Helena, a packet boat, built in the United States in 1841
- USS Helena, name of various United States Navy ships
- USS Helena I (SP-24), United States Navy patrol boat

== Science ==
- Helena, a taxonomic synonym for the plant genus Narcissus
- "Helena", theoretical founding ancestor of Haplogroup H
- "Helena", name used in ancient Greece for the phenomenon now referred to as St. Elmo's fire
- 101 Helena, main belt asteroid

== Other uses ==
- Helena (artwork), a 2000 art installation featuring goldfish in blenders
- HELENA, the Helmholtz Graduate School Environmental Health
- G-AAXF Helena, a named Handley Page H.P.42 airliner

== See also ==
- Elena (disambiguation)
- Eleni (disambiguation)
- Helen (disambiguation)
- Helene (disambiguation)
- Hellen
