= Eleni =

Eleni is a transliteration of the Greek name Ελένη, also written as Helen, Helene:

- Eleni (given name), including lists of people with that name
- Eleni (film), 1985 film adaptation of Gage's book, by Peter Yates
- SS Eleni, Greek cargo ship in service 1959–71

== See also ==
- Elaine (disambiguation)
- Elena (disambiguation)
- Ellen (disambiguation)
- Helen (disambiguation)
- Helen (given name)
- Helena (disambiguation)
- Helene (disambiguation)
