= Helen =

Helen may refer to:

== People ==
- Helen (mythology), several people in Greek mythology
  - Helen of Troy, the most beautiful woman in the world
- Helen (actress) (born 1938), Indian actress
- Helen (given name), a given name (including a list of people with the name)

== Places ==
- Helen, Georgia, United States, a small city
- Helen, Maryland, United States, an unincorporated place
- Helen, West Virginia, a census-designated place in Raleigh County
- Helen Falls, a waterfall in Ontario, Canada
- Lake Helen (disambiguation), several places called Helen Lake or Lake Helen
- Helen, an ancient name of Makronisos island, Greece

== Arts, entertainment, and media ==
=== Film and television ===
- Helen (2008 film), a British drama starring Annie Townsend
- Helen (2009 film), an American drama film starring Ashley Judd
- Helen (2017 film), an Iranian drama film
- Helen (2019 film), an Indian film produced by Vineeth Sreenivasan
- "Helen" (Atlanta), 2018 TV episode
- Helen Television System, a Saint Lucian radio and television network

=== Literature ===
- Helen (novel), an 1834 novel by Maria Edgeworth
- Helen (play), a play by Euripides
- Helen, Sweetheart of the Internet, an American comic strip

=== Music ===
- Helen (album), a 1981 Grammy-nominated album by Helen Humes
- Helen (EP), an EP by Helen Shapiro
- Helen (band)

=== Fictional characters ===
- Helen (Inheritance), a fictional supporting character in Christopher Paolini's Inheritance trilogy
- Helen Daniels, a character from the Australian soap opera Neighbours
- Helen Dubois, a character in the television series Drake & Josh who later becomes a principal inVictorious
- Helen Lorraine, a character in the book and tv adaptation series Martha Speaks
- Helen Lovejoy, a recurring character in the animated sitcom The Simpsons
- Helen Parr, aka Elastigirl in the Pixar franchise The Incredibles
- Helen Shivers, a character in the film I Know What You Did Last Summer
- Helen Simmons-McCarter, central protagonist in the 2005 film Diary of a Mad Black Woman
- Helen Stacy, mother to Gwen in the Marvel Cinematic Universe
- Helen Wheels, a character in Ben 10

== Other uses ==
- Helen (rocket), an ARCA demonstration vehicle
- Helen (unit), a humorous unit of measuring beauty
- Helen Oy, Finnish energy company in Helsinki, Finland
- Hyolitha § Helens, curved supports at the end of the shells of an extinct group of marine invertebrates
- Nakajima Ki-49, a Japanese World War II bomber given the reporting name "Helen"
- List of storms named Helen
- SS Esso Nashville, an oil tanker later named Helen

== See also ==
- Elena (disambiguation)
- Eleni (disambiguation)
- Ellen (disambiguation)
- Helen of Troy (disambiguation)
- Helena (disambiguation)
- Helene (disambiguation)
- Hélène (disambiguation)
- Helenus, son of King Priam of Troy
- Hellen, son of Deucalion and Pyrrha and eponym of the Hellenes in Greek mythology
- Hellenic (disambiguation), pertaining to Greece or the Greeks
- Helon (disambiguation)
- List of storms named Helene
  - Hurricane Helene (2024) – extremely large and destructive Category 4 hurricane that made landfall in the Big Bend region of Florida, and caused catastrophic flooding and damage across the Southeastern U.S.
- St. Helen (disambiguation)
- Yelena
