= Comateens =

American new wave band

The Comateens were originally a new wave duo formed in 1978 in New York City by bassist/vocalist Nicholas Dembling (a.k.a. Nic North / Nick West) and guitarist Ramona Janquitto, who performs under the name Ramona Jan. Soon after, Lyn Byrd joined on vocals and synthesizer, and the duo became a trio. When Jan departed in 1980, North's brother Oliver joined on guitar, completing the final lineup.

They contributed two tracks to the influential Marty Thau Presents 2x5 compilation, and their debut album, the self-titled Comateens (1980), featured the band's original compositions alongside covers of "Summer in the City" (The Lovin' Spoonful), "TVC 15" (David Bowie), and the theme song from TV's The Munsters. Pictures on a String, their first album for Virgin Records, followed in 1983, yielding the dance club hit "Get Off My Case". In 1984, the band released their final album, Deal with It, which featured live drums played by Chuck Sabo.

The band split up in 1985. Oliver North died in 1987 of asthma-related heart failure due to a heroin overdose. In 1988 Nic North (now Nicholas West) and Lyn Byrd recorded an album, West & Byrd, together. In 1990 the duo, again under the name Comateens, recorded the song "A Place for Me", an English language adaptation of the Julien Clerc and Françoise Hardy song "Fais-moi une place", and it became a European hit. Virgin Records released a retrospective compilation of their music in 1991 called One By One: Best Of Comateens which has become a rare and much sought-after record among collectors of new wave music. In 1995, their video for "The Late Mistake" was mocked in a season five episode of Beavis and Butt-head called "Top O'The Mountain".

In November 2023, Nicholas Dembling and Ramona Jan reunited as friends and re-released original single "Danger Zone" backed with "Elizabeth's Lover" on Left-for-Dead Records.

== Discography ==
=== Albums ===
- Comateens (1981)
- Pictures on a String (1983)
- Deal with It (1984)
- Comateens (limited collectors edition) (2007)

=== Compilations ===
- One by One - The Best of the Comateens (1991)

=== West & Byrd ===
- West & Byrd (1988)
