= Helena micropolitan area =

The Helena micropolitan area may refer to:

- The Helena, Arkansas micropolitan area, United States
- The Helena, Montana micropolitan area, United States

== See also ==
- Helena (disambiguation)
