= Helene =

Helene or Hélène may refer to:

== People ==
- Helene (name), and Hélène, a female given name, including a list of people with the name
- Hélène (singer) (Hélène Rollès, born 1966), French actress and singer
- Helen of Troy, a figure in Greek mythology

== Arts and entertainment ==
=== Music ===
- Hélène (opera), by Saint-Saëns, 1904
- Hélène (album), by Roch Voisine, 1989
  - "Hélène" (Roch Voisine song), 1989
- Hélène, a series of albums by Hélène Rollès
- Hélène, album by Hélène Ségara 2002
- "Hélène" (Julien Clerc song), 1987
- Hélène-Polka in D minor, by Alexander Borodin, 1861

=== Other uses in arts and entertainment ===
- Hélène (drama), an 1891 play by Paul Delair
- Helene Willfüer, Student of Chemistry (novel), by Vicki Baum, 1928
  - Helene Willfüer, Student of Chemistry (film), 1930
  - Hélène (film), a 1936 French drama film based on the novel
- Helene (2020 film), Finnish biographical film about Helene Schjerfbeck

== Other uses ==
- List of storms named Helene
  - Hurricane Helene, a 2024 Atlantic hurricane
- Helene (moon), of Saturn
- French frigate Hélène, launched in 1791

== See also ==
- Helena (disambiguation)
- Helen (disambiguation)
- Eleni (disambiguation)
- Ellen (disambiguation)
