= Apaturia (mythology) =

Ancient Greek mythological epithet

Apaturia (Ancient Greek: Ἀπατουρία) was an epithet given to more than one goddess in Greek mythology. The name meant "the deceitful".

== Athena ==
The name Apaturia was given to the goddess Athena by Aethra, the mother of Theseus, who received a dream from Athena urging her to travel to the island of Sphairia to pour a libation for a charioteer of Pelops. After Aethra awoke she traveled to the island and was there raped by the god Poseidon.

Aethra later established there a temple to this aspect of the goddess, and started a custom where brides would offer up their maidenhood belts before marriage to Athena Apaturia. Athena Apaturia continued to be worshipped by the Troezenians in this manner.

== Aphrodite ==
Apaturia was an epithet of the goddess Aphrodite at Phanagoria and other places in the Taurian Chersonesus, where it originated, according to tradition, in this way: Aphrodite was attacked by giants, and called Heracles to her assistance. He concealed himself with her in a cavern, and as the giants approached her one by one, she surrendered them to Heracles to kill them.
