= Elenin =

Elenin (Russian: Еле́нин) may refer to:

- Leonid Elenin, a Russian amateur astronomer. He also discovered the following comets below:
  - 479P/Elenin
  - C/2010 X1 (Elenin)
  - P/2014 X1 (Elenin)
  - C/2015 X4 (Elenin)
  - C/2017 A3 (Elenin)
- Elenin Vrah, a mountain in Rila Municipality of Bulgaria
- Platon Elenin, an alias of Russian businessman Boris Berezovsky

== See also ==
- Eleni (disambiguation)
- Lenin (disambiguation)
