= Eleni Konsolaki =

Greek archaeologist

Eleni Konsolaki, also Eleni Konsolaki-Giannopoulou or Eleni Konsolaki-Yannopoulou (Greek: Ελένη Κονσολάκη-Γιαννοπούλου) is a Greek archaeologist who has excavated in Troezen, Poros and Methana on the south-western coast of the Saronic Gulf.

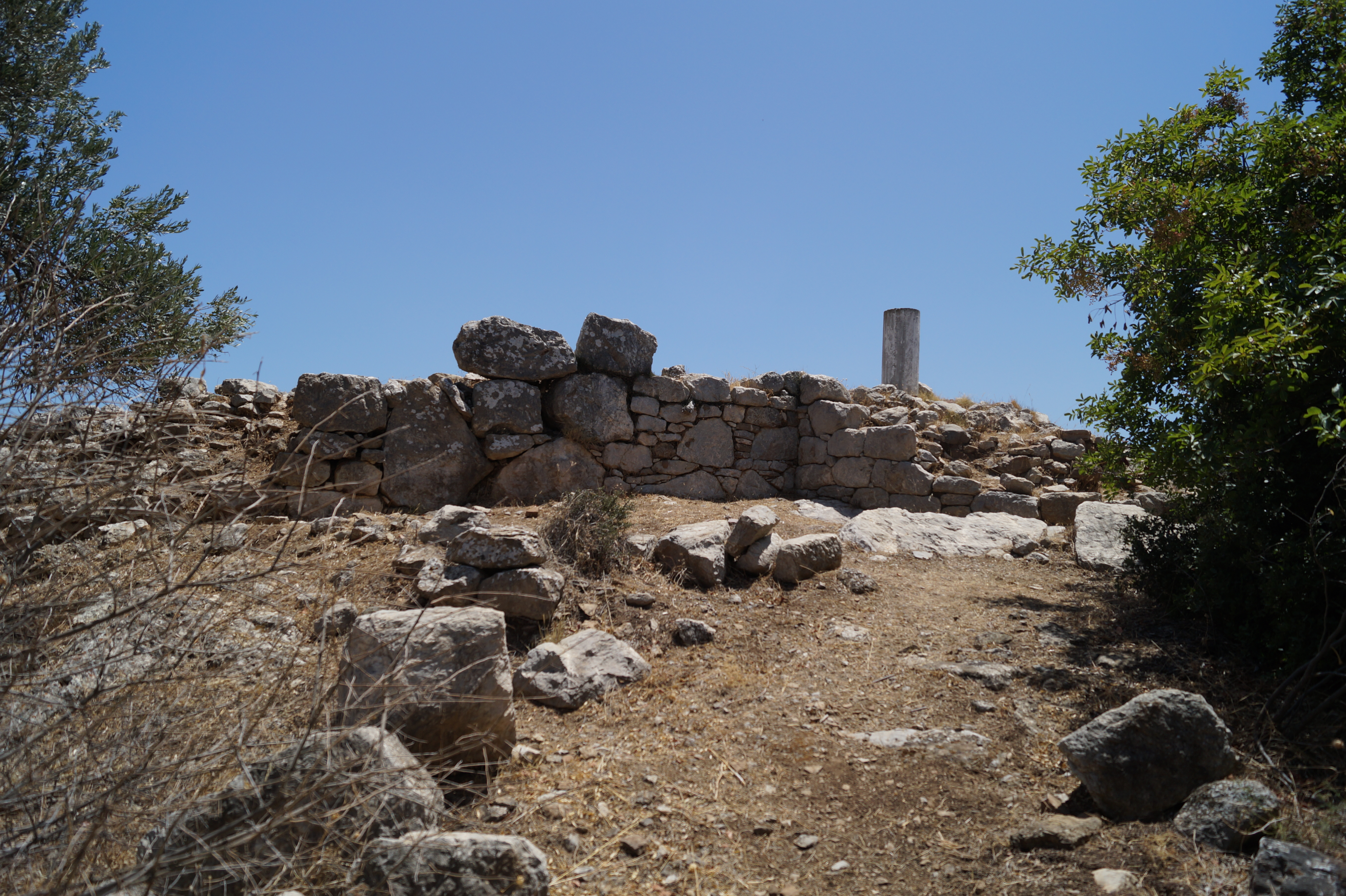
Part of the Magoula Acropolis, where Konsolaki has worked

In 1990 Konsolaki discovered a Mycenaean building in Methena, from which she described over 150 'cult images', including small clay figures of animals, and of horses with riders.

Konsolaki has investigated the Mycenaean Magoula Acropolis near Galatas, adjacent to the islands of Poros. Here she discovered several Mycenaean buildings, and showed that the Troezen area was of great importance in ancient times and had connections with the Minoan civilization.

Konsolaki has worked for the Archaeological Museum of Poros.

== Publications ==
- Conference report on to the history of the Saronic Gulf, Poros 1998, (Published in Athens in 2003))
