= Elen =

Elen may refer to:

- Elen (saint), a Welsh saint
- Elen ferch Llywelyn (c. 1206–1253)
- Elen Dosia, a French opera singer
- Elen Levon, a Ukrainian singer, actress and dancer
- Elen Shakirova, a Russian former basketball player
- Elen Willard (born 1935), an American actress
- European Language Equality Network, a European NGO to promote linguistic diversity

== See also ==
- Ellen (disambiguation)
