= Ellen (disambiguation) =

Ellen is a female given name.

Ellen may also refer to:

== Places ==
- Mount Ellen (Utah)
- Mount Ellen (Vermont), in the Green Mountains
- Lake Ellen (Minnesota)
- Lake Ellen (Wisconsin)
- Port Ellen, Argyll, Scotland
- River Ellen, Cumbria, England
- Ellen Glacier, Ellsworth Mountains, Antarctica
- 2735 Ellen, an asteroid

== People and fictional characters ==
- Ellen, a list of people and fictional characters with the given name
- Ellen (surname), a list of people

== Ships ==
- USS Ellen, several United States Navy ships
- Ellen (1883) (or SS Ellen), a ship wrecked in South Australia
- E-ferry Ellen, a battery-powered ferryboat that operates in Denmark

== Other uses ==
- Ellen (TV series) (1994–1998), a sitcom about a bookstore owner, starring Ellen DeGeneres
- The Ellen DeGeneres Show (2003–2022), a syndicated talk show
- Ellen; or, The Fanatic's Daughter, an 1860 novel
- Tropical Storm Ellen (disambiguation), including a list of storms with the name
- Ellen Street, Fremantle, Western Australia

== See also ==
- Port Ellen distillery, whisky distillery in Scotland
- Elen (disambiguation)
- Ellenburg, New York
- Ellon (disambiguation)
