= Ellon =

Ellon may refer to:

- Ellon, Aberdeenshire, a town in Scotland
  - Ellon Academy, a secondary school in the town
  - Ellon and District (ward), a ward of Aberdeenshire Council
  - Ellon Castle
  - Ellon Park and Ride
  - Ellon railway station, a former railway station
  - Ellon RFC, a rugby union team
  - Ellon Times, a weekly newspaper
  - Ellon United F.C., an association football team
- Ellon, Calvados, a commune in Normandy, France

== See also ==
- Ellen (disambiguation)
