= Ellena =

Ellena is a surname. Notable people with the surname include:

- Jack Ellena, (1931–2012), American football player
- Éric Elléna (fl. 2000s–2010s), French filmmaker
- Greg Ellena (fl. 1980s), baseball player
- Jean-Claude Ellena (born 1947), French perfumer
- Richard Ellena (born 1951), Anglican Bishop of the Diocese of Nelson

== See also ==
- Elena (disambiguation)
