= USS Helena =

Five ships of the United States Navy have been named USS Helena, after the city of Helena, Montana, though only four were completed.

- USS Helena (PG-9) was a gunboat in service from 1897 to 1932.
- USS Helena (CL-50) was a Brooklyn-class light cruiser, commissioned in 1939, that saw heavy action in the Solomon Islands during World War II, ultimately being sunk in the Battle of Kula Gulf in July 1943.
- USS Helena (CL-113) was a planned Fargo-class light cruiser canceled in 1944 while under construction.
- USS Helena (CA-75) was a Baltimore-class heavy cruiser commissioned in 1945, active in the Korean War, and decommissioned in 1963.
- USS Helena (SSN-725) is a Los Angeles-class nuclear attack submarine commissioned in 1987 and decommissioned in 2025.

== See also ==
- USS Helena I (SP-24), a patrol boat in commission from 1917 to 1919
