= Mélissa (song) =

Single by Julien Clerc

from the album Aime-moi
- Released: 1984
- Composer(s): Julien Clerc

"Mélissa" is a song by French singer-songwriter Julien Clerc. It was released as a single from his 1984 album Aime-moi.

It is one of Clerc's most famous songs.

The name "Mélissa" evokes a "quasi-mythical female character". As Radio Paname! put it, the song is a "vibrant tribute to youth and mysterious love" and is "distinguished by its captivating melody and poetic lyrics".

== Charts ==
Chart (1985)	Peak position
Europe (European Top 100)	44
France (SNEP)	2
France (Peripheral radio)	1
France (FM radio)	6
Quebec (Francophone charts)	8
