= Si on chantait =

Single by Julien Clerc

from the album Liberté, égalité, fraternité... ou la mort
- Released: 1972
- Composer(s): Julien Clerc

Music video
- "Si on chantait" on YouTube

"Si on chantait" is a song by French singer-songwriter Julien Clerc. It was released as a single from his 1972 album Liberté, égalité, fraternité... ou la mort.

It is one of Clerc's most famous songs. It is composed by Julien Clerc himself, the lyrics are by Étienne Roda-Gil.

As Radio Paname! puts it, the song is "a joyful call to celebrate life through music". According to the radio, "The song reflects the spirit of freedom and carefreeness of the 70s in France. With its dynamic rhythm and positive message, it invites people to come together and share moments of happiness, highlighting the importance of music as a social bond."

== Charts ==
Chart (1972–74)	Peak position
Belgium (Ultratop 50 Wallonia)	4
Netherlands (Dutch Top 40)	9
Netherlands (Single Top 100)	9
