= Sphaeria =

Coordinates: 37°29′04″N 23°28′36″E

Sphaeria or Sphairia (Ancient Greek: Σφαιρία), later called Hiera (Ἱερά), is a former island of ancient Argolis described by Pausanias as in the immediate vicinity of Calaureia, and separated from the mainland (Peloponnesus) by a strait so narrow and shallow that there was a passage over it on foot.

Pausanias wrote that on the island was the tomb of Sphaerus (Ancient Greek: Σφαίρος), who was a charioteer of Pelops. In addition, he wrote that according to legend Aethra saw Athena in a dream, and Athena told her to go to the island to give offerings to Sphaerus. Aethra went to the island and Poseidon had intercourse with her there. For this reason Aethra set up a temple of Athena Apaturia (Ancient Greek: Ἀθηνᾶς Ἀπατουρίας) on the island. Due to this the name of the island changed to Sacred (Ἱερά) Island. Furthermore, she also established a custom for the Troezenian maidens of dedicating their girdles before wedlock to Athena Apaturia.

At present there is only one island, now called Poros; but as this island consists of two hilly peninsulas united by a narrow sandbank, William Martin Leake concluded that this bank is of recent formation, and that the present island comprehends what was formerly the two islands of Calaureia and Sphaeria.
