= Elena =

Elena may refer to:

== People ==
- Elena (given name), including a list of people and characters with this name
- Raymond Elena (1931–2024), French former professional racing cyclist
- Joan Ignasi Elena (born 1968), Catalan politician
- Francine Elena (born 1986), British poet

== Geography ==
- Elena (town), a town in Veliko Tarnovo Province, Bulgaria
  - Elena Municipality
- Elena (village), a village in Haskovo Province

== Film and television ==
- Elena (2011 film), a 2011 Russian film
- Elena (2012 film), a Brazilian film
- Elena (TV series), a Mexican telenovela
- Elena of Avalor, an American TV series
- Daniele Cortis, a 1947 Italian film also known as Elena

== Music ==
- Elena (Cavalli), a 1659 opera by Francesco Cavalli
- Elena (Mayr), an 1814 opera by Simon Mayr
- "Elena" (song), a 1979 song by The Marc Tanner Band
- Elena, an EP by Puerto Muerto

== Other ==
- Elena (play), a Cebuano play by Vicente Sotto
- Extra Low ENergy Antiproton ring, a storage ring in the Antiproton Decelerator facility at CERN
- Hurricane Elena

== See also ==
- Eleni (disambiguation)
- Ellena, a surname
- Helena (disambiguation)
