= Elena (village) =

Elena Елена
- Village
- Location in Bulgaria
- Coordinates: 41°50′30″N 25°47′30″E
- Country: Bulgaria
- Province: Haskovo Province
- Municipality: Haskovo
- Time zone: UTC+2 (EET)
  - Summer (DST): UTC+3 (EEST)

Elena (Bulgarian: Елена) is a village in the municipality of Haskovo, in Haskovo Province, in southern Bulgaria.

This village, once belonged to the Hasköylü Ağalık, (Agaluk of Haskovo)
