= Poros =

Island and municipality in Greece

Poros Πόρος
- Municipality
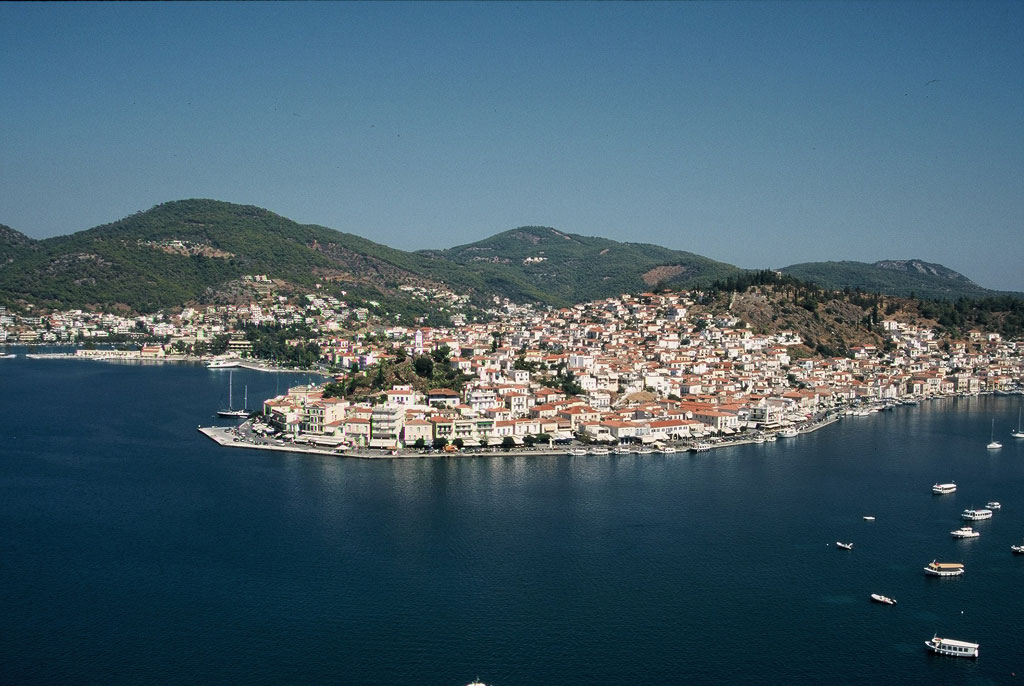
- View of Poros

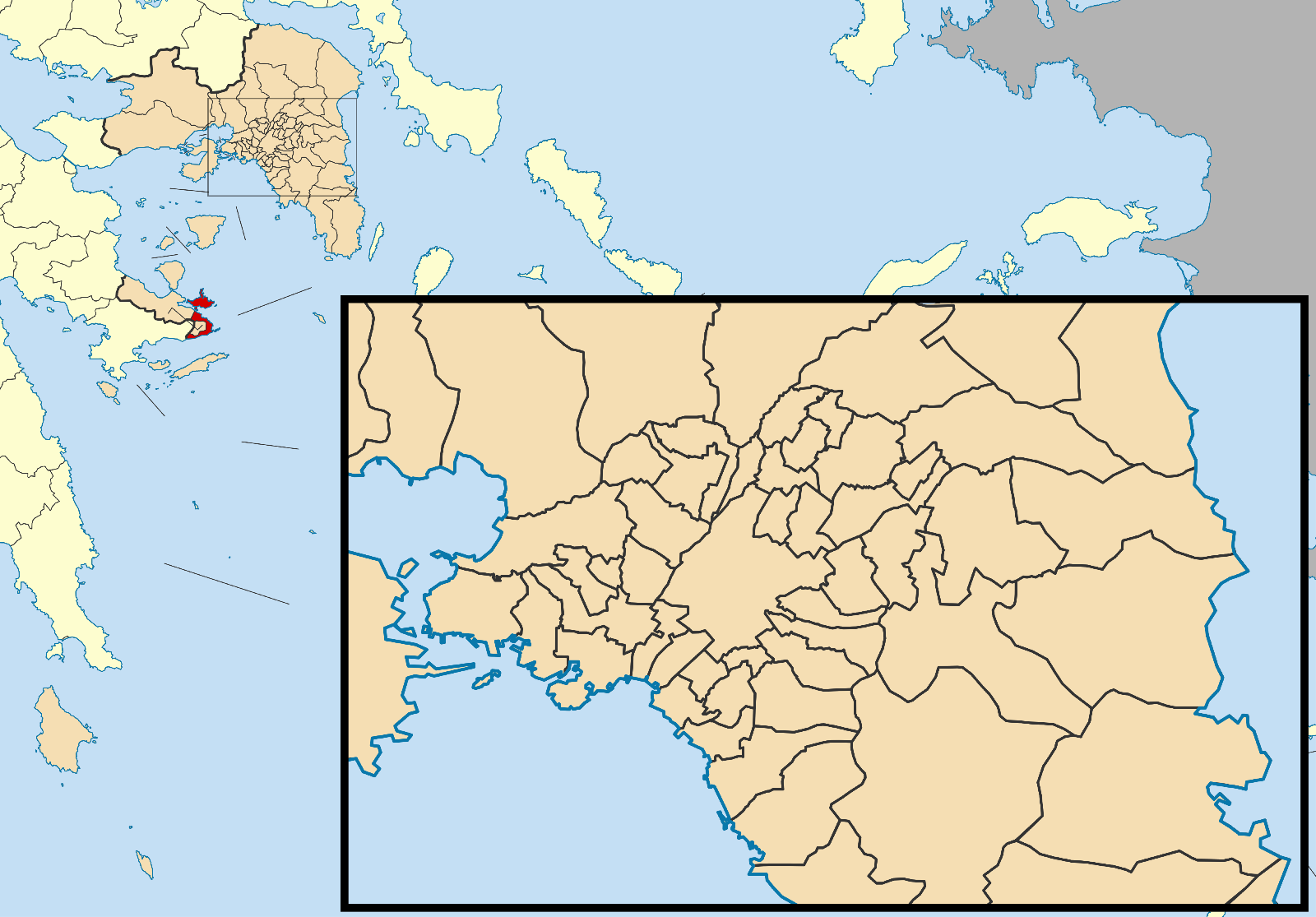

- Location within Greece
- Coordinates: 37°31′N 23°29′E
- Country: Greece
- Administrative region: Attica
- Regional unit: Islands

Government
  - Mayor: Georgios Koutouzis (since 2023)

Area
  - Municipality: 49.582 km^{2} (19.144 sq mi)

Population (2021)
  - Municipality: 3,261
  - Density: 65.77/km^{2} (170.3/sq mi)
- Time zone: UTC+2 (EET)
  - Summer (DST): UTC+3 (EEST)
- Postal code: 180 20
- Area code: 22980
- Vehicle registration: YI, YK, YM, YN
- Website: www.poros.gr

Poros (Greek: Πόρος; Modern Greek pronunciation: [ˈporos]) is a small Greek island-pair in the southern part of the Saronic Gulf, about 58 km (36 miles; 31 nautical miles) south of the port of Piraeus and separated from the Peloponnese by a 200 m (656 ft) wide sea channel, with the town of Galatas on the mainland across the strait. Its surface area is about 31 square kilometres (12 sq mi) and it has 3,261 inhabitants (2021). The ancient name of Poros was Pogon. Like other ports in the Saronic, it is a popular weekend destination for Athenian travellers.

Poros consists of two islands: Sphaeria (Greek: Σφαιρία, pronounced [sfeˈria]), the southern part, which is of volcanic origin, where today's city is located, and Kalaureia (Greek: Καλαυρία, [kalavˈria]), also Kalavria or Calauria (meaning 'gentle breeze'), the northern and largest part. A bridge connects the two islands over a narrow strait.

Poros is an island with rich vegetation. Much of the northern and far eastern/western sides of the island are bushy, whereas large areas of old pine forest are found in the south and center of the island. It has a good road network and adequate tourist infrastructure, which makes it a popular resort for short holidays.

== Geography ==
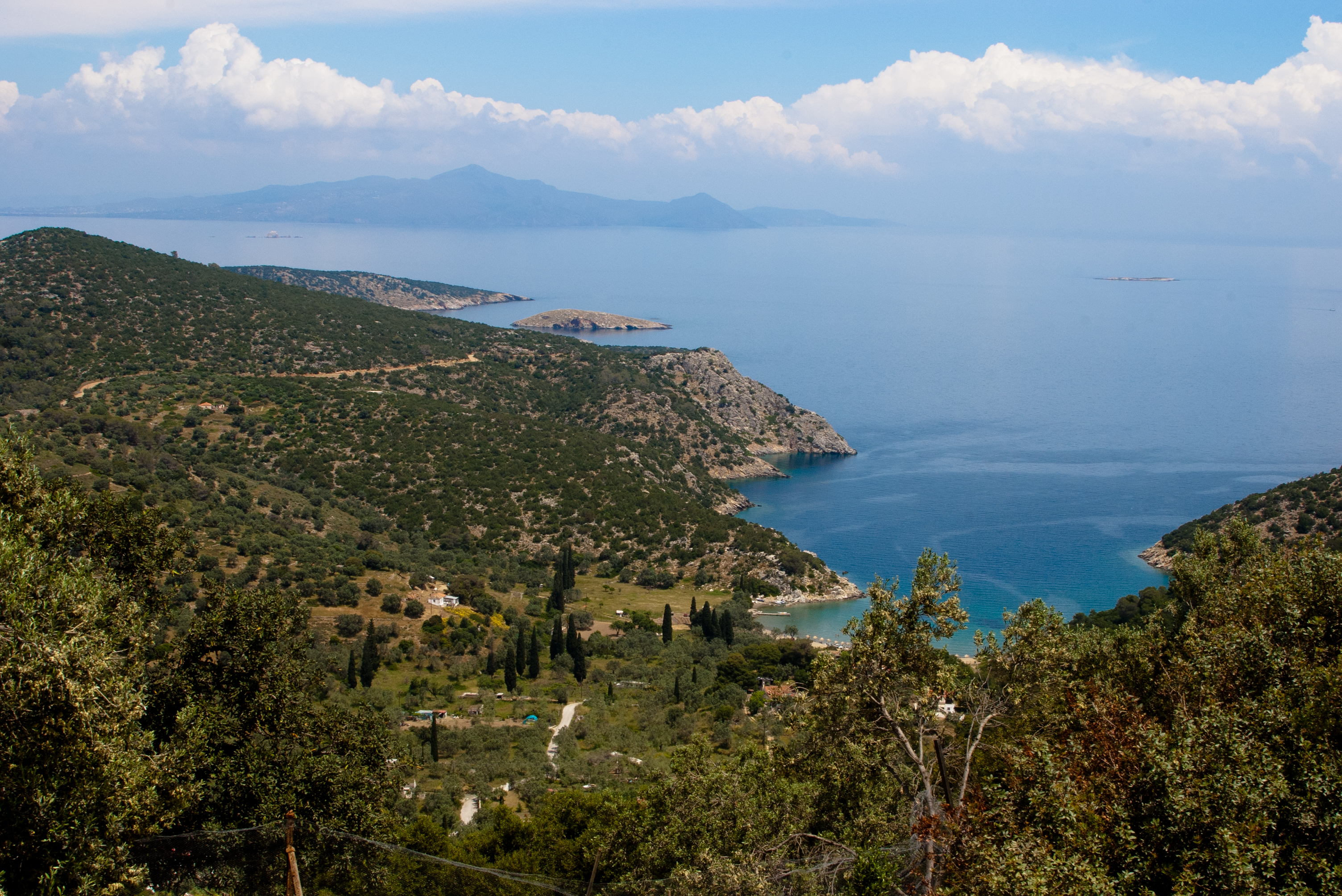
The bay of Vayionia (Βαγιονιά), the harbour of ancient Kalaureia with Aegina at the horizon.

The land area of the municipality is 49.582 square kilometres (19.144 sq mi). This includes the islands and part of the adjacent Peloponnese coast, adjacent to Galatas, Thermisia and the island of Hydra. The landscape is very hilly and mountainous. The highest peak is the Vigla (358 m) in the west-central part. Following the island's topography and geology, small creeks and seasonal streams flow through steep valleys of the southern and northeastern part. The western and northern part of the island feature smooth hills and shallow valleys. Sandy beaches are restricted to the southern shore of the island, except for a bay in the northern part called Vayionia.

Poros contains the main village Poros and the smaller villages Ágios Nektários and Kyaní Aktí.

=== Geology ===
The geology of the island comprises Mesozoic to Cenozoic sedimentary rocks (limestone, and Flysch-type sandstone) and ophiolites, as well as Neogene volcanic rocks on Sferia. The island is tectonically dissected and part of a Tertiary tectonic mélange. There are karstic sinkholes in the island's central limestone massif, and limestone caves with stalactites. Visible marine fossils are mainly found in the limestone, no occurrences of precious stones or ore deposits are known.

Limestone from Poros, an example of the poros stone, was an important component in the construction of Mycenaean tholos tombs in the Late Bronze Age, being used particularly for monuments at Mycenae, including the Tomb of Aegisthus.

== History ==
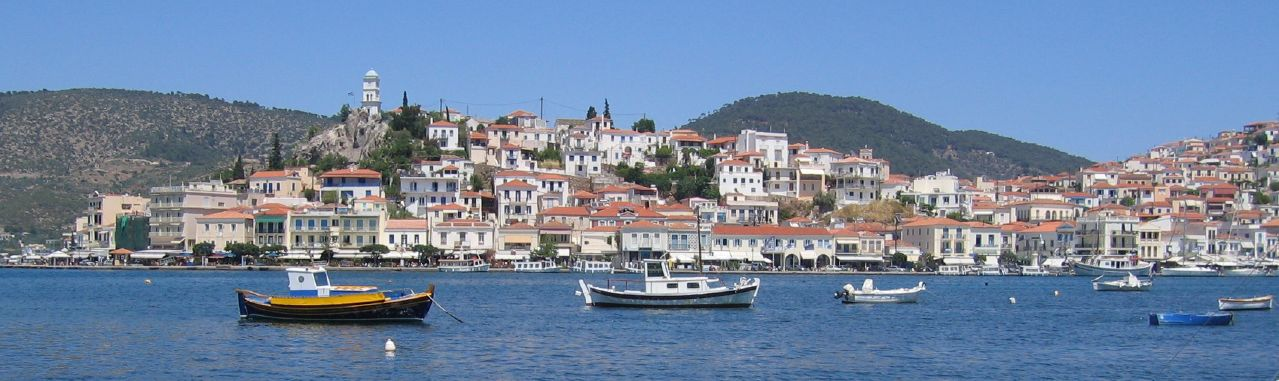
Poros town from Galatas on the mainland

In the northeastern part of the island, in a location called “Kavos Vasili”, the archaeologists have discovered the ruins of a settlement of the Early Bronze Age. This settlement is the oldest of the wider area of Trizinia, Peloponnese, and is believed to be interrelated with the wreck found on the nearby Dokos island which dates to the same period.

=== Antiquity ===
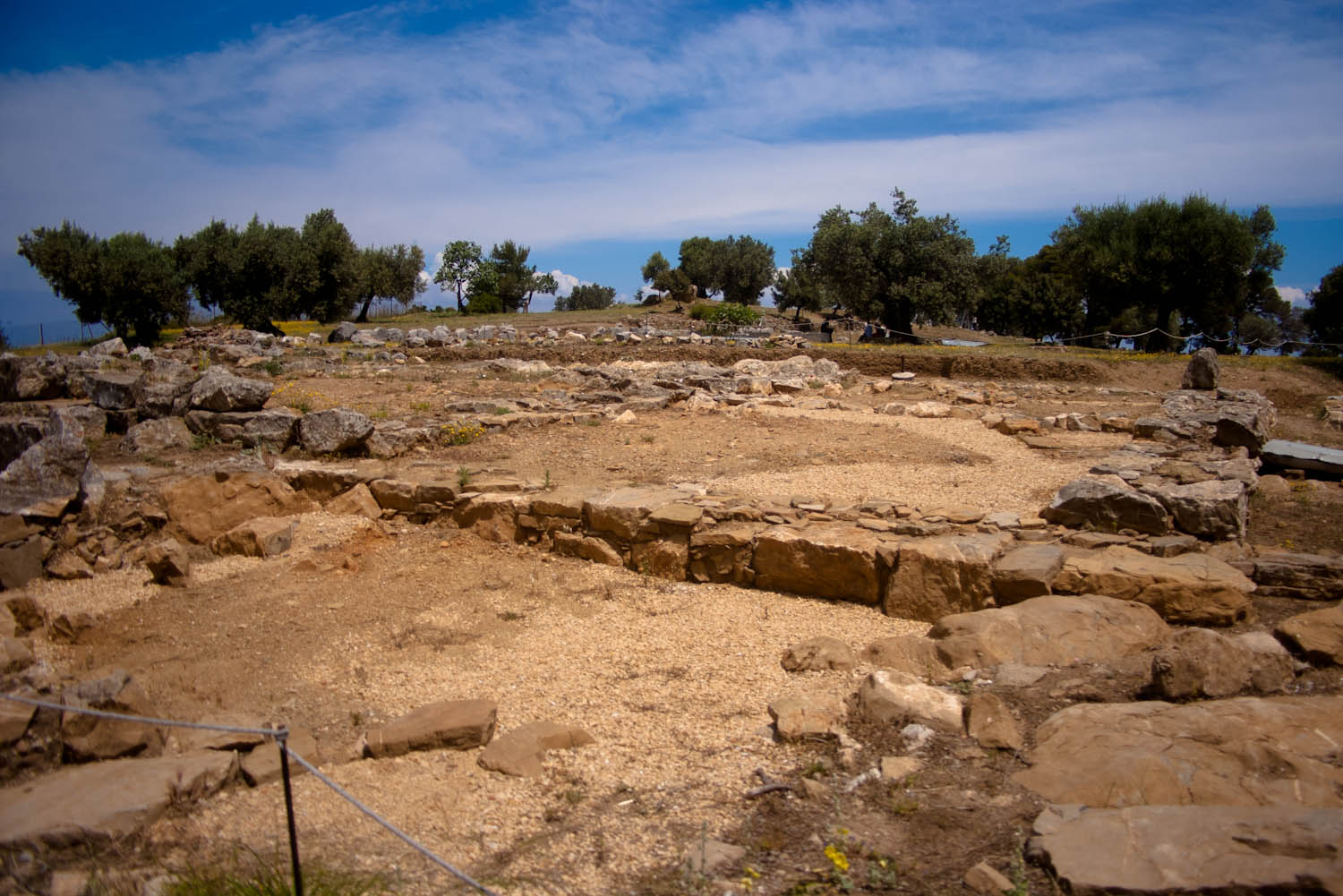
Sanctuary of Poseidon

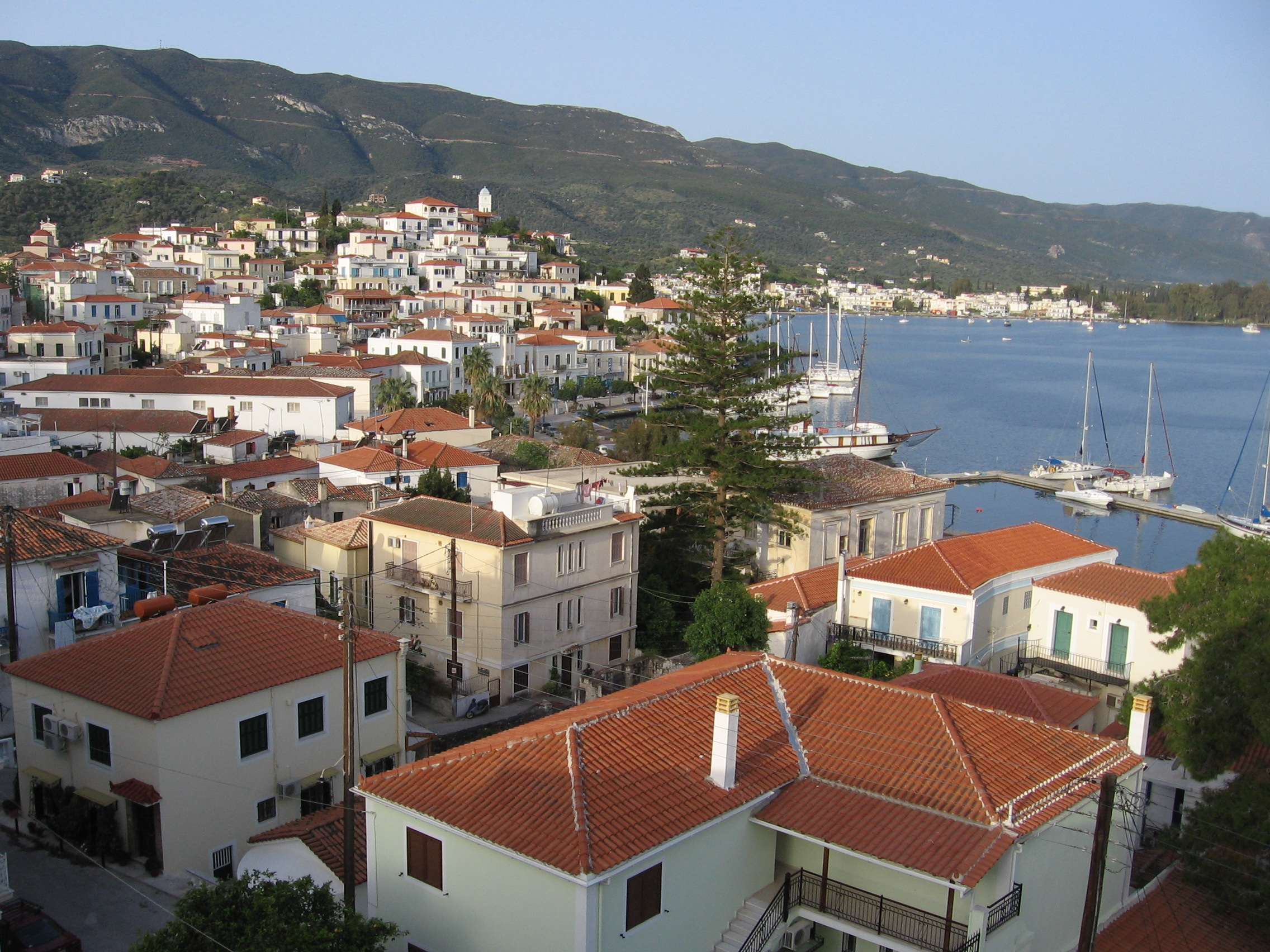
Panoramic view

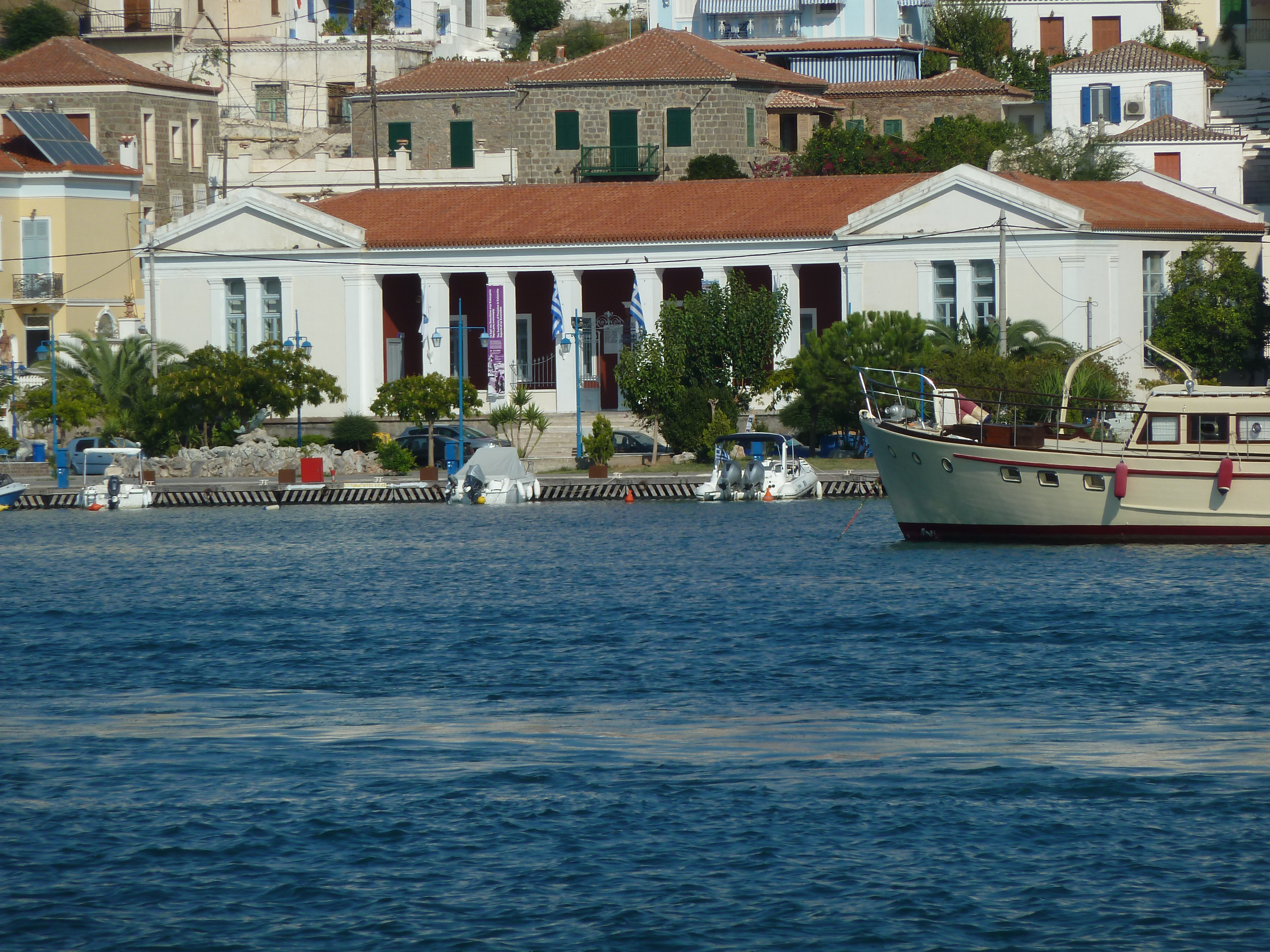
Seafront

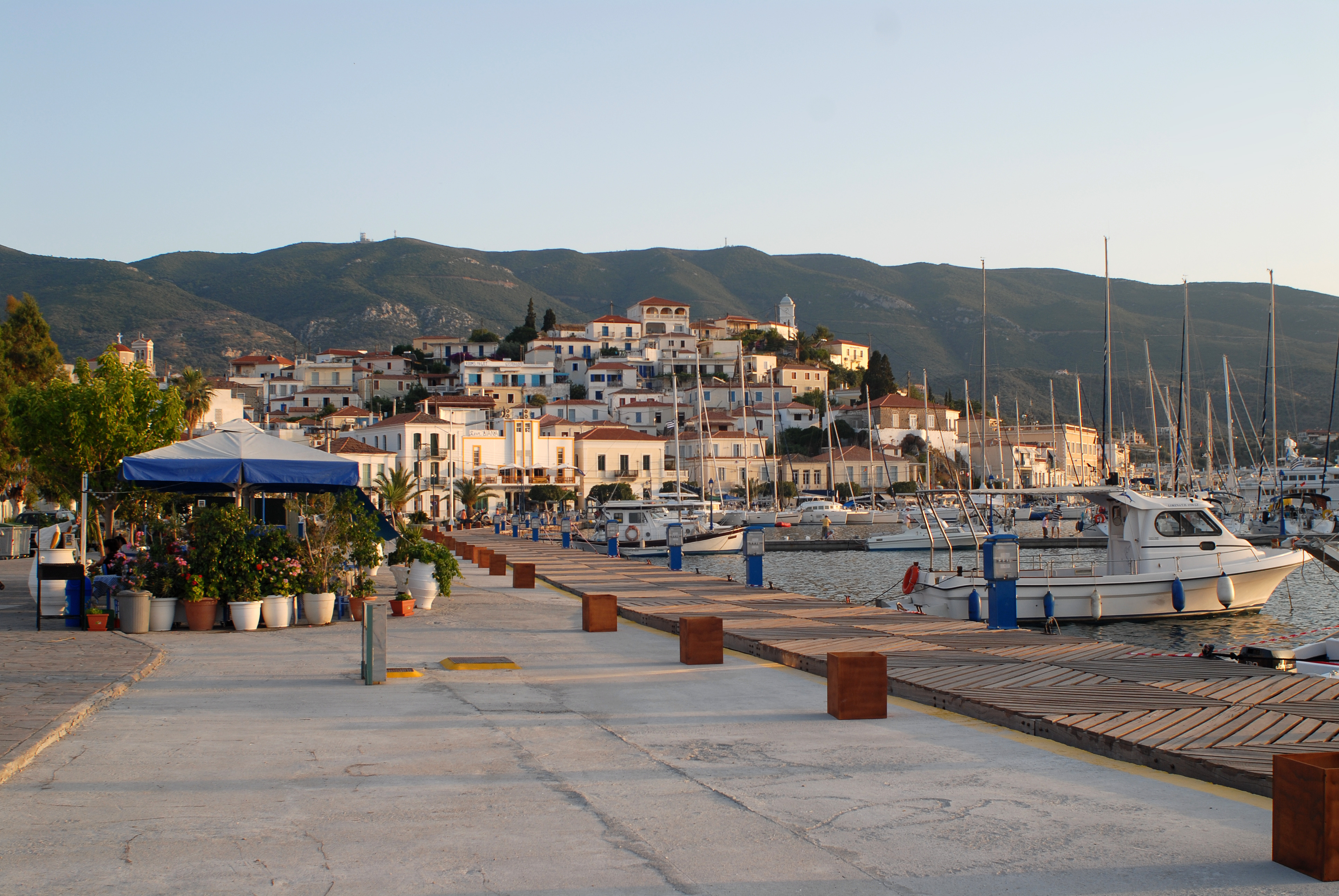
View of the port

Poros was divided into two islands during antiquity: Sphairia (also known by its modern Greek form Sfairia) and Calauria (also known by its ancient Greek form Kalaureia and its modern Greek form Kalavria). Sphairia consisted of the area of the modern island which includes its current capital. Calauria was the larger part of the island to its north. During the period of Mycenaean dominance (1400-1100 BC) Calauria was quite powerful and the most important naval base of region was located on islet Monti or Liontari on its eastern coast. The city-state of Calauria was home to an asylum dedicated to Poseidon, the ruins of which are still accessible on a hilltop close to the town. This asylum may have been linked to the sanctuaries at Geraistos and Tainaros. Ancient historians stated that Calauria was the center of an amphictyony, a religious alliance between its city-state and those of Athens, Poros, Aegina, Epidaurus, Hermione, Troezen, Nauplio, Orchomenus, and Prasaiai. Modern archaeology has discovered no evidence for its actual existence, however, and now believe the "Calaurian League" to have been a later Hellenistic invention. An enormous feast was found dating to the Hellenistic period in the ruins of the Calaurian asylum, along with a plaque celebrating the "revival" of its amphictyony.

During the 5th century, the Persian Empire annexed the Greek cities of western Anatolia. When the Athenians helped these cities in a revolt against Persian rule, Poros, along with the other Greek states of mainland Greece and the Aegean islands, was drawn into the Greco-Persian Wars. At the beginning of the Peloponnesian War, Troezen and Calauria offered asylum to an anti-Macedonian politician who eventually became the tyrant of the region. After the death of Alexander the Great in 323 BC, the Ptolemies of Egypt occupied Calauria. Around the same time, the Athenian orator Demosthenes came to the island, where some report his suicide. In 273 BC, the last explosion of the Methana volcano dramatically changed the morphology of Poros and the wider region.

The Sanctuary of Poseidon has been excavated by Swedish archaeologists. The 1894 field season is considered to be the first Swedish archaeological campaign in Greece. Swedes have continued excavations from 1997 in collaboration with the Greek National Heritage Board.

=== Roman and Byzantine times ===
During the Roman period (86 BC to 395 AD) Poros was part of the Roman Empire along with Trizina, to which it was a tributary. In Byzantine times, Poros and other islands were often raided by the pirates that dominated the Aegean Sea.

=== Venetian period ===
In 1484 the Venetians occupied Poros and used it as a strategic port in their sea battles with the Ottomans. Poros was the most powerful city of the wider area, also governing Methana Island, Epidaurus, Damalas (Trizina), Fanari and Valario. During that time, the island had about 15,000 inhabitants, making it one of the largest cities in Greece. Arvanites were recorded among the inhabitants of the island in 1688. They lived in poverty as most did in Greece at the time. Venetian rule ended in 1715.

=== Ottoman period ===
The Ottoman Period began in 1715, much later in Poros than in the rest of Greece. Shipping and commerce were the inhabitants' main activities, but Poros' fleet wasn't as famous as Hydra's or Spetses' fleet, and did not participate in many sea battles.

=== The Greek Revolution ===
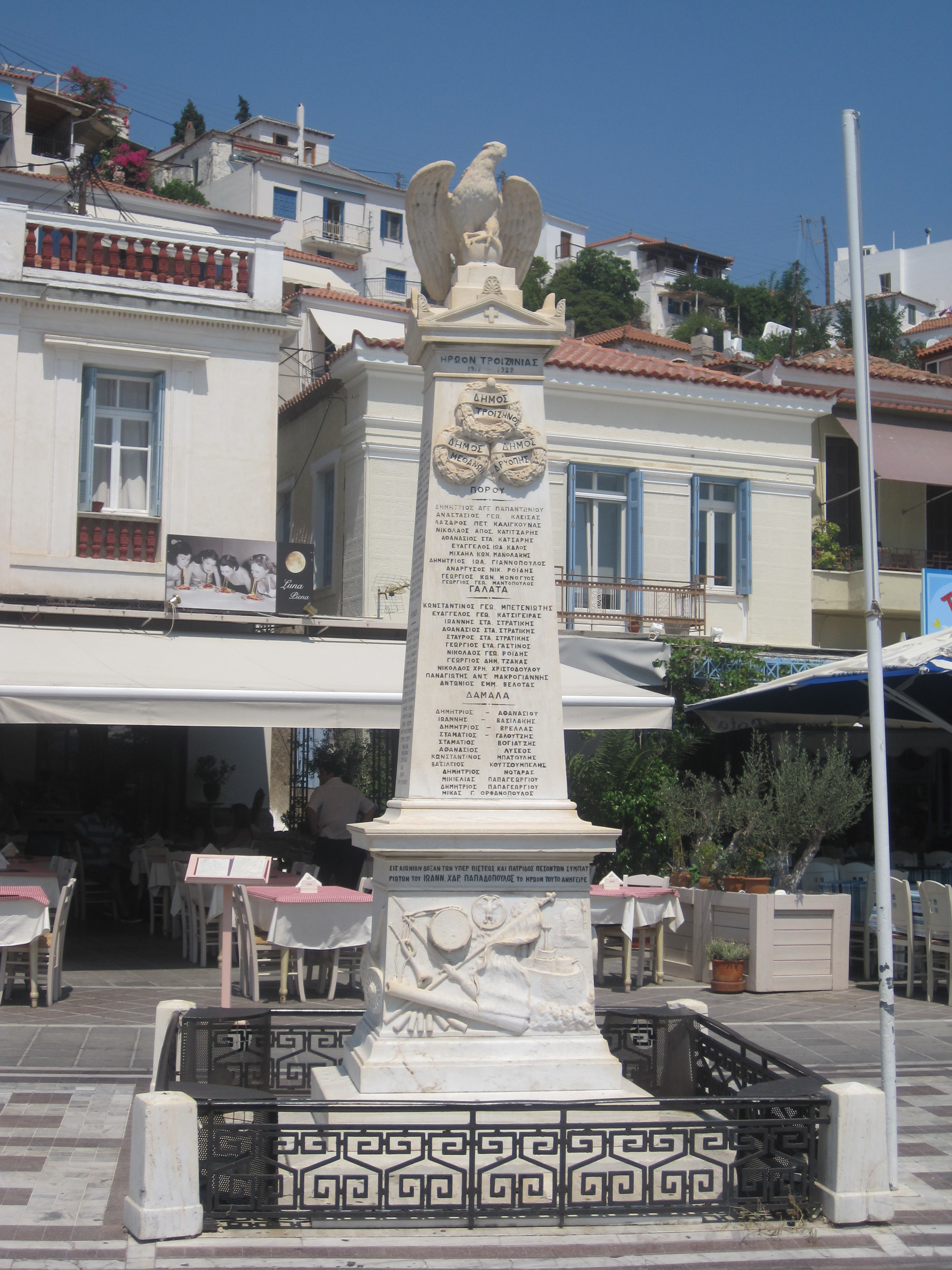
Monument for the Greek revolution. The eagle's beak has been repaired since this photo was taken.

Poros had an important role during the Greek Revolution in 1821, due to its strategic position. The Greek revolutionary leaders, often met in Poros to discuss and plan their future actions. The first Greek naval base was established in Poros in 1828 and remained there until 1878. In September 1828, the ambassadors of England, France and Russia met in Poros with Ioannis Kapodistrias in order to determine the borders of the future Greek state, which was established two years later, in 1830.

=== Russian naval base ===
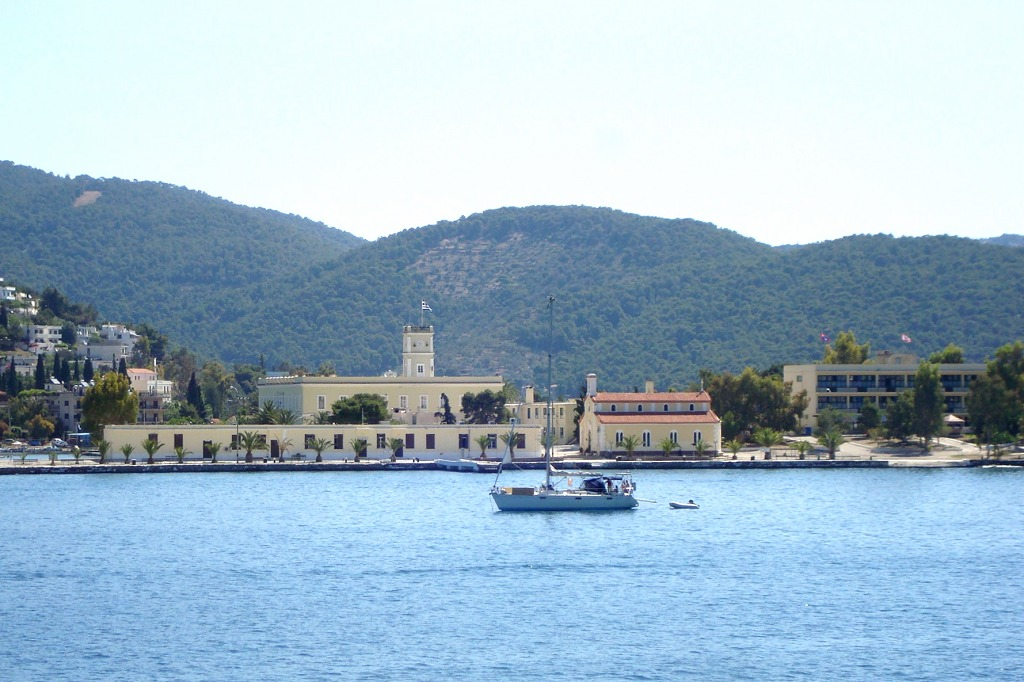
Hellenic Navy base

With the Treaty of Kuchuk Kainarji, Russia secured free shipping for its navy, war and merchant alike, throughout the waters of the Ottoman Empire. As Russian naval activity grew, need arose for a supply station, and land was acquired at the edge of Poros town. Extensive materiel, coal, and food storage facilities were built, as well as a hardtack baking factory. After Greek independence, Governor Capodistrias requisitioned the facilities for use of the Greek war navy, and offered the Russians an alternative location in a nearby cove. The new facilities were far larger, and were used by Russian ships throughout the 19th century. The number of Russian residents of Poros increased and even a Russian school was established. Then as Russian naval activity declined, so did the base and by the early 20th century only a single Russian watchman was left guarding it. It was then granted to the Greek Navy by the Czar but was never put to actual use, and the abandoned buildings were left to decay. The ruins, in elaborately carved stone, were listed as protected architectural monuments in 1989.

=== Twentieth century ===
In the beginning of the 20th century, among the activities of the Poros' inhabitants were agriculture (mainly wheat, grapevines and olives), livestock, fishing and shipping.

== Main sights ==
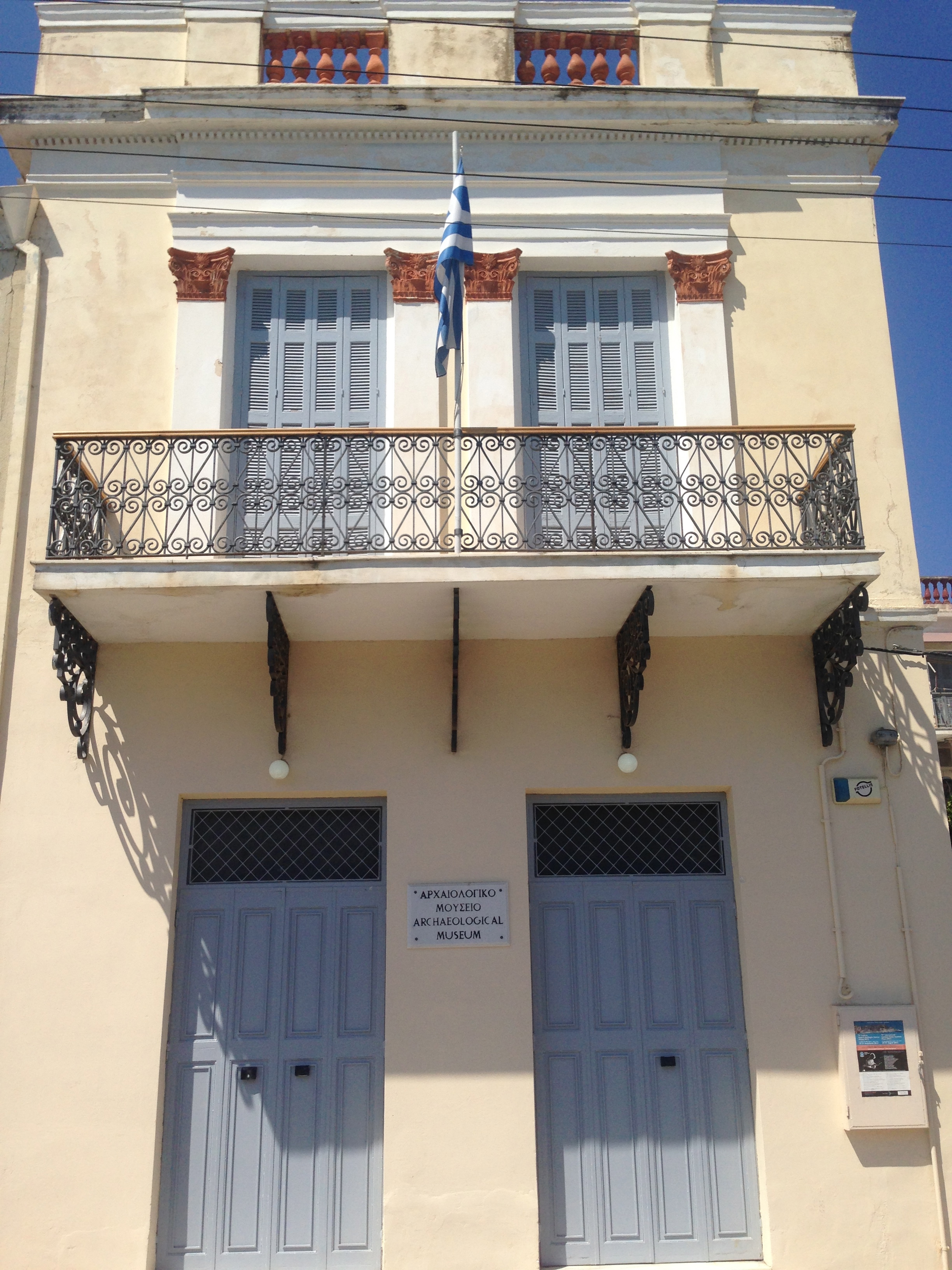
Archaeological Museum of Poros

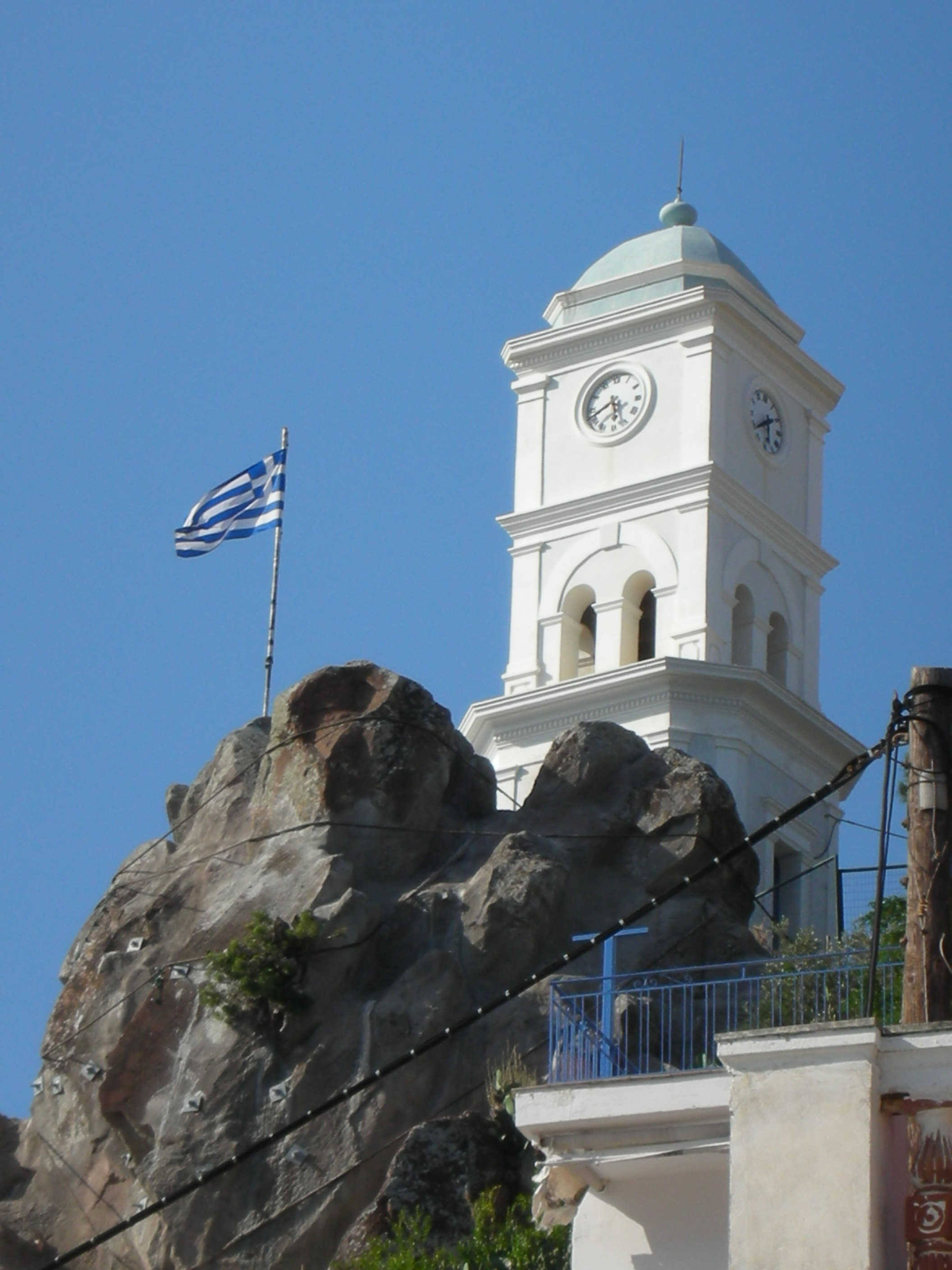
Poros clock tower

- The town of Poros, with its neoclassical edifices, is built amphitheatrically on the slopes of a hill. Its most famous landmark is a clock tower built in 1927.
- The Archaeological Museum of Poros, at Korizis Square, houses findings from the Sanctuary of Poseidon, from ancient Troizen, and from other archaeological sites nearby.
- In the northern part of the island are the remains of the Sanctuary of Poseidon, the centre of the Kalaureian amphictyony. The exact date it was built is not known, although researchers estimate it to have been around 520 BC. The dimensions of the temple, which is of the Doric order, are 27.4×14.4 m. There are six columns on each short side and twelve on each long side. It was here that Demosthenes, the famous orator, poisoned himself with hemlock in 322 BC fleeing from the Macedonian Governor Antipatros.
- Poros was the site of the first naval base in modern Greece, established in 1827 during the Greek War of Independence. Most of the activities of Poros naval base were moved to Salamis Naval Base in 1881. The site is still used today by the Hellenic Navy as a training centre for naval personnel.
- Bourtzi castle. It was built by von Heideck at around 1828, at the place where an old church of St. Constantine had stood. The island was given to the Poros monastery from 1770 on, by Antonios Serfos. The stand-off between Hydra island and Capodistrias was the cause for heavy fighting here in 1831.
- Poros Shell Museum. Founded in 2006, a permanent exhibition, Shells from the Greek Seas, is displayed at the Chatzopouleios Library. More info can be found on the webpage.
- The Holy Monastery of Zoodochos Pigi, founded in 1720 AD, is located 4 km east of the main city of Poros island. It is built on the slope of a pine forest. In 1814, a group of monks from Mount Athos took refuge in this monastery. A few years later, these monks founded the Zoodochos Pigi Monastery at Longovarda on Paros. Katholiko is a basilica with a dome and a tower-like belfry being the main church of the monastery.

== Historical population ==
Year	Town population	Municipality population
1981	3,929	-
1991	3,273	3,570
2001	4,059	4,282
2011	3,651	3,993
2021	2,806	3,261

== Notable people ==
- Alexandros Koryzis (1885–1941), Prime Minister of Greece. A museum in Poros is dedicated to his life.
- Minos Kyriakou (1942–2017), Greek billionaire businessman
- Henry Miller (1891–1980), American writer wrote about Poros in The Colossus of Maroussi: "I don't know which affected me more deeply-the story of the lemon groves just opposite us or the sight of Poros itself when suddenly I realized we were sailing through the streets. If there is one dream which I like above all others it is that of sailing on land. Coming into Poros gives the illusion of the deep dream. Suddenly the land converges on all sides and the boat is squeezed into a narrow strait from which there is no egress. The men and women of Poros are hanging out of the windows just above your head. You pull in right under their frosty nostrils, as though for a shave and a haircut en route. The loungers on the quay are walking with the same speed as the boat. They can walk faster than the boat if they choose to quicken their pace."
- Other prominent literary people have written about the beauty of Poros such as the Nobel laureate Giorgos Seferis, Kosmas Politis, Kostis Palamas, and Ιoulia Dragoumi.

== Transportation ==
Poros is linked to mainland Greece by a car ferry to Galatas. Poros has no airport but is easily accessible from Athens by ferry or hydrofoil.

There is local bus service on the island from Poros harbor to Neorio and Monastiri.

A bike sharing system named Cyclopolis is also available, with one station and a capacity of 13 bikes. Users can register for a small fee and rent bikes for free for up to 3 hours per rental.

== See also ==
- List of volcanoes in Greece
- List of municipalities of Attica, including the Saronic
- List of islands of Greece
