= Archaeological Museum of Poros =

Archaeological museum in Poros, Greece

Coordinates: 37°29′54.29″N 23°27′17.03″E

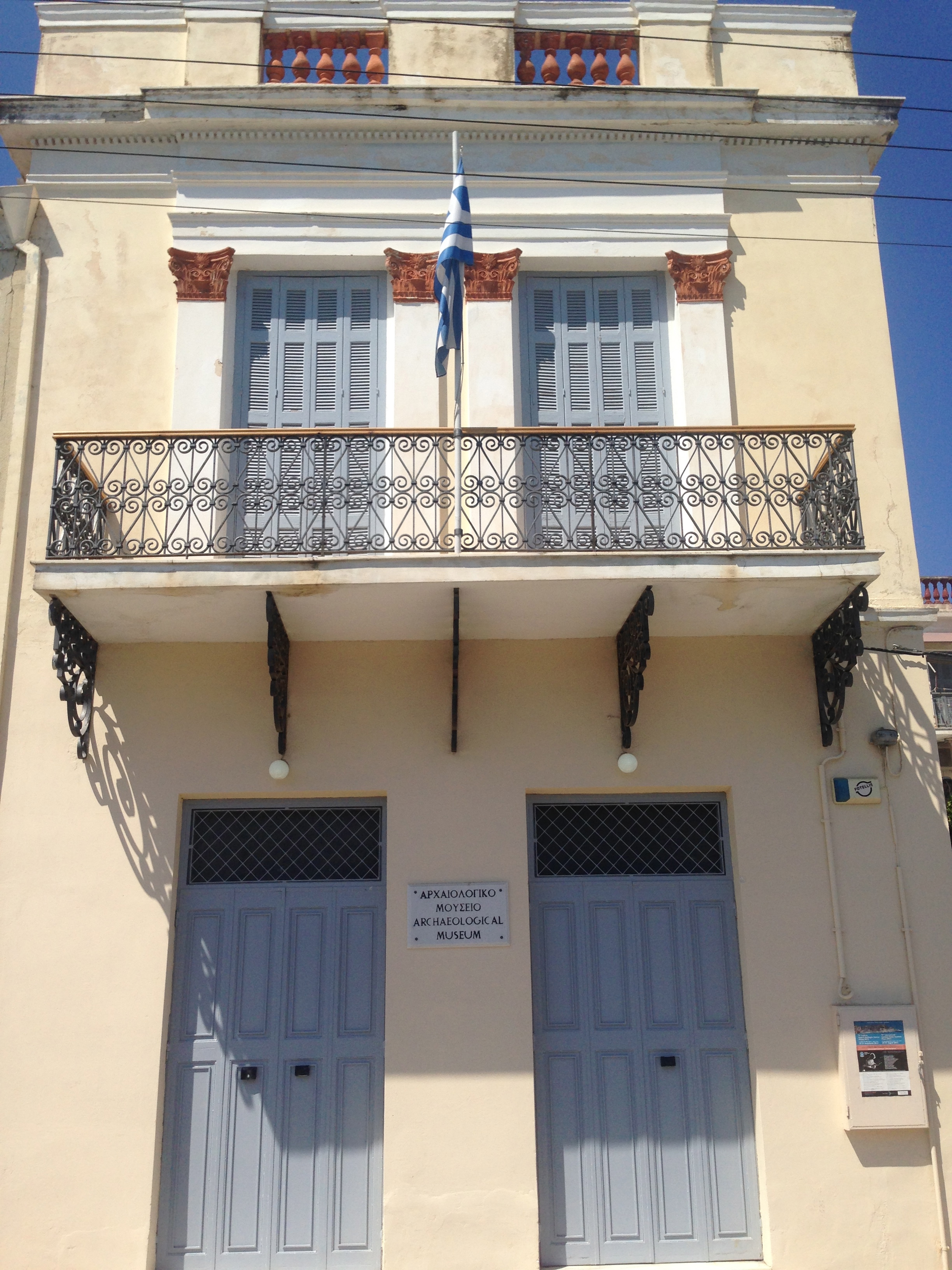
Facade Archaeological Museum in Poros

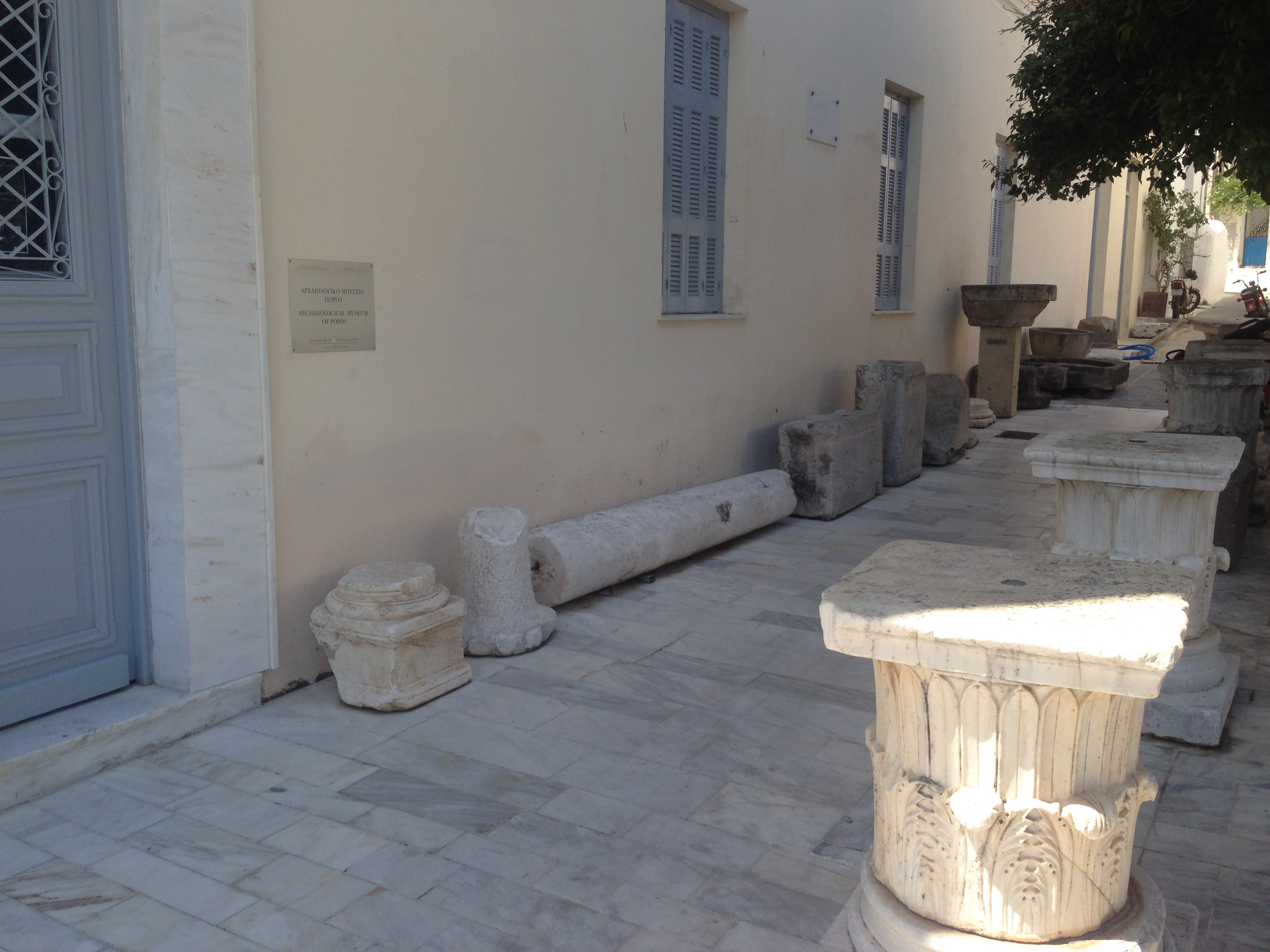
Outside Archaeological Museum in Poros

The Archaeological Museum of Poros is a museum located on Koryzis Square in Poros, Greece.

The museum was built in the 1960s on a plot of land donated by the Koryzis family. The displays of the museum date from the Mycenaean era to Roman times.

The museum contains a notable collection of artefacts dug by the French Archaeological School in Troezen.
