= Helena, South Carolina =

- Census-designated place
- Location within South Carolina Location within the United States
- Coordinates: 34°16′50″N 81°38′40″W
- Country: United States
- State: South Carolina
- County: Newberry

Area
  - Total: 1.42 sq mi (3.67 km^{2})
  - Land: 1.42 sq mi (3.67 km^{2})
  - Water: 0 sq mi (0.00 km^{2})
- Elevation: 518 ft (158 m)

Population (2020)
  - Total: 870
  - Density: 613.4/sq mi (236.82/km^{2})
- Time zone: UTC-5 (Eastern (EST))
  - Summer (DST): UTC-4 (EDT)
- ZIP Code: 29108 (Newberry)
- Area codes: 803/839
- FIPS code: 45-33100
- GNIS feature ID: 2812979

Helena is an unincorporated community and census-designated place (CDP) in Newberry County, South Carolina, United States. It was first listed as a CDP prior to the 2020 census with a population of 870.

== Geography ==
The CDP is in central Newberry County bordered to the east by the city of Newberry, the county seat. South Carolina Highway 121 (Kendall Road) runs north-south through Helena, connecting with U.S. Route 76 north of Newberry and with South Carolina Highway 34 southwest of Newberry.

== Demographics ==
Historical population
Census	Pop.	Note	%±
2020	870		—
U.S. Decennial Census; 2020

Helena first appeared as a census designated place in the 2020 U.S. census.

=== 2020 census ===
Helena CDP, South Carolina – Racial and ethnic composition Note: the US Census treats Hispanic/Latino as an ethnic category. This table excludes Latinos from the racial categories and assigns them to a separate category. Hispanics/Latinos may be of any race.
Race / Ethnicity (NH = Non-Hispanic)	Pop 2020	% 2020
White alone (NH)	45	5.17%
Black or African American alone (NH)	732	84.14%
Native American or Alaska Native alone (NH)	2	0.23%
Asian alone (NH)	0	0.00%
Pacific Islander alone (NH)	1	0.11%
Some Other Race alone (NH)	0	0.00%
Mixed Race or Multi-Racial (NH)	22	2.53%
Hispanic or Latino (any race)	68	7.82%
Total	870	100.00%
