= Ma préférence =

Single by Julien Clerc

from the album Jaloux
- Released: 1978
- Composer: Julien Clerc
- Lyricist: Jean-Loup Dabadie

Music video
- "Ma préférence" on YouTube

"Ma préférence" is a song by French singer-songwriter Julien Clerc. It was released as the first single from his 1978 album Jaloux.

The song is composed by Julien Clerc himself, the lyrics are by lyricist Jean-Loup Dabadie. It is one of Clerc's most famous songs.

The song is characterized by its "poignant lyrics and captivating melody". As Radio Paname! put it, the song "speaks of love and loyalty, evoking nostalgia and emotional attachment".

== Charts ==
Chart (1978)	Peak position
Netherlands (Dutch Top 40)	32
Netherlands (Single Top 100)	37
