= Ce n'est rien =

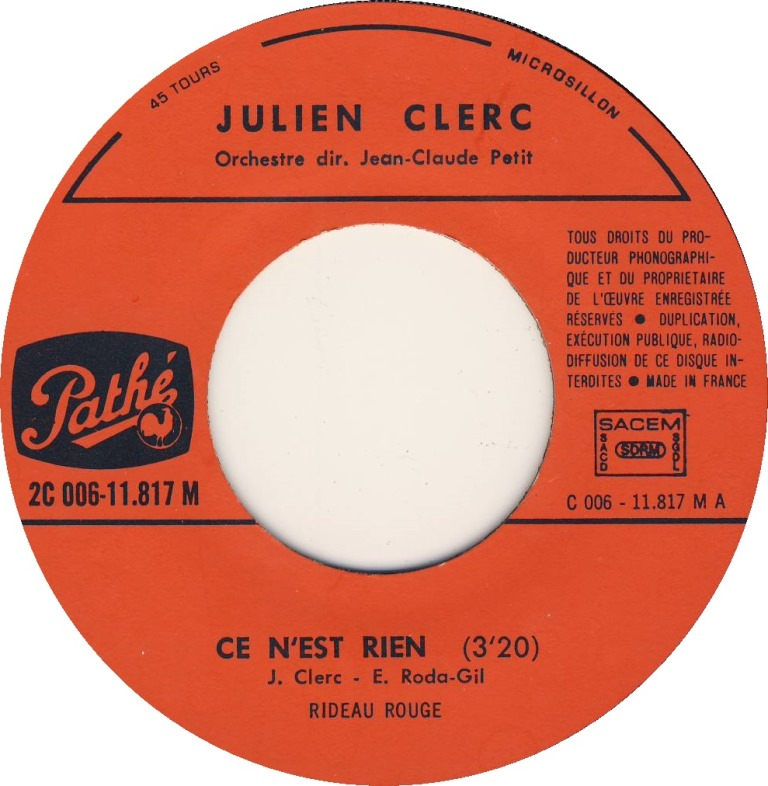

Single by Julien Clerc

from the album Niagara
- Released: 1971
- Composer: Julien Clerc
- Lyricist: Étienne Roda-Gil

Music video
- "Ce n'est rien" on YouTube

"Ce n'est rien" is a song by French singer-songwriter Julien Clerc. It was released as the first single from his 1971 album Niagara.

The song is composed by Julien Clerc himself, the lyrics are by Étienne Roda-Gil. It is one of Clerc's most famous songs.

It is an optimistic song with a catchy melody. As Radio Paname! put it, the song "asks us to put the worries of everyday life into perspective" and conveys a "message of resilience and hope".

The single reached the top 10 in France and number one on the Belgian Telemoustique chart.

== Charts ==
Chart (1971–1974)	Peak position
Belgium (Ultratop 50 Wallonia)	4
Netherlands (Dutch Top 40)	16
Netherlands (Single Top 100)	23
