= Helen Lake (Vancouver Island) =

- Location within Vancouver Island
- Location: Vancouver Island, British Columbia
- Coordinates: 49°18′45″N 125°11′25″W
- Lake type: Natural lake
- Basin countries: Canada

Helen Lake is a lake located on Vancouver Island north of the head of Taylor Arm, Sproat Lake.

== See also ==
- List of lakes of British Columbia
