= Lake Helen (Wyoming) =

Lake in Big Horn County, Wyoming, USA

- Location within Wyoming Location within the United States
- Location: Big Horn Mountains, Big Horn County, Wyoming, US
- Coordinates: 44.322866°N 107.220168°W
- Basin countries: United States
- Surface elevation: 9,968 ft (3,038 m)

Lake Helen is a lake in the U.S. state of Wyoming's Big Horn Mountains. It is in the Cloud Peak Wilderness Area and may only be accessed by backpacking or on horse. The elevation of the lake is 9968 feet.
