= Ellen (surname) =

Ellen is the surname of:

- Cliff Ellen (born 1930), Australian actor, nephew of Joff Ellen
- Joff Ellen (1915–1999), Australian actor and comedian born Raymond Charles Ellen
- Mark Ellen (born 1953), English magazine editor, journalist and broadcaster
- Mary Ann Ellen (1897–1949), New Zealand rural women's advocate, community leader and hairdresser
- Roy Ellen (born 1947), British professor of anthropology and human ecology
- Shane Ellen (born 1973), former Australian rules footballer

== See also ==
- J. Harold Ellens (1932–2018), psychologist and theologian
