= Lake Helen (Portage County, Wisconsin) =

Lake in the state of Wisconsin, United States

- Location within Wisconsin Location within the United States
- Location: Portage County, Wisconsin
- Coordinates: 44°37′06″N 89°14′30″W
- Type: lake
- Basin countries: United States
- Surface elevation: 1,099 ft (335 m)

Lake Helen is a lake in the U.S. state of Wisconsin.

According to tradition, the lake is named after a lady named Helen who cooked for local lumberjacks in the 1880s.
