= Fais-moi une place =

1990 single by Julien Clerc

Single by Julien Clerc

from the album Fais-moi une place
- B-side: "Gare à la casse"
- Released: January 1990
- Recorded: 1989
- Genre: Pop, chanson
- Length: 3:35
- Label: Virgin
- Composer(s): Julien Clerc
- Lyricist(s): Françoise Hardy
- Producer(s): Phil Ramone

Julien Clerc singles chronology
"Les Menhirs" (1988)	"Fais-moi une place" (1990)	"Fille de feu" (1990)

"Fais-moi une place" is a 1989 pop song recorded by French singer Julien Clerc. Written by Françoise Hardy with a music composed by Clerc, it was the first single from his 15th studio album Fais-moi une place, on which it appears as the seventh track, and was released in January 1990. It achieved success in France where it was a top ten hit and won the category "Song of the year" at the 1991 Victoires de la Musique.

== Background and writing ==
Clerc and Hardy had a first collaboration in 1988, on Clerc's album Les Aventures à l'eau. In 1989, he proposed to Hardy several of his compositions, but she was not interested by them; however, the last one he played, the one which was later that of "Fais-moi une place", pleased her, though the melody was not finished. Hardy had an audio cassette of the composition, and about three days later, she sent Clerc a version of "Fais-moi une place" with her own lyrics and sung by her, asking him not to change a single thing, as she deemed that the first attempt was always good and that she would not rewrite the lyrics. Clerc eventually recorded the song in New York.

== Music video ==
The black and white music video for "Fais-moi une place" was directed by Didier Le Pecheur.

== Critical reception ==
"Fais-moi une place" was elected "Song of the year" at the 1991 Victoires de la Musique. Elia Habib, an expert of the French charts, qualified it as a "1990s standard", and Anthony Martin of RTL deemed it a "great" and "melancholy" song.

== Cover versions ==
In 1989, the same year of the recording by Clerc, Hardy made her own version of "Fais-moi une place" on the compilation Vingt ans vingt titres, as she stated she liked the song. In 1990, American group Comateens covered the song in a very bubble gum version titled "A place for Me", which was released as a single in 1991. "Fais-moi une place" was also covered by Michel Delpech (Les Plus Belles Chansons françaises, 1996), Jérémy Amelin of Star Academy 5 (Les Meilleurs Moments, 2005), Maurane and Christophe Willem (Kiss and Love for Sidaction, 2014) and Liane Foly (Crooneuse, 2016). In 2019, Clerc covered the song as a duet with his daughter Vanille and considered that this version expressed more the love between parents and children.

== Chart performance ==
In France, "Fais-moi une place" debuted at number 30 on the chart edition of 10 February 1990, which was the highest debut that week; then it climbed every week and reached a peak of number eight in its fourth week, and remained for a total of 13 weeks in the top 50. On the European Hot 100, it started at number 89 on 3 March 1990, reached a peak of number 34 in its third week, and appeared on the chart for ten weeks. Much played on radio, it also charted for eight weeks on the European Airplay Hot 100, with a peak for two weeks at number 21, and was number one on the French AM national airplay.

== Track listings ==
- CD single
1. "Fais moi-une place" — 3:35
2. "Gare à la casse" — 3:52
3. "Le Verrou" — 2:22
- 7" single
1. "Fais moi-une place" — 3:35
2. "Gare à la casse" — 3:52
- 7" single - Promo
1. "Fais moi-une place" — 3:35
- 12" single - Promo
1. "Fais moi-une place" — 3:35

== Charts ==
Weekly chart performance for "Fais-moi une place"
Chart (1990)	Peak position
Belgium (Ultratop 50 Flanders)	43
Europe (European Airplay Top 50)	21
Europe (Eurochart Hot 100)	34
France (Airplay Chart [AM Stations])	1
France (SNEP)	8

== Release history ==
Country	Date	Format	Label
France	1990	CD single	Virgin
France	1990	7" single	Virgin
France	1990	Promotional 7" single	Virgin
France	1990	Promotional 12" single	Virgin
