= Eleni Karinte =

First love of Mustafa Kemal Atatürk

Eleni Karintine
- Other name: Eleni Kriyas
- Partner: Mustafa Kemal Atatürk
- Family: Edrim Karintine (father)

Eleni Karinte (Greek: Ελένη Καριντέ) was a Greek woman of Aromanian descent, popularly known as the first love of the founder of the Turkish Republic, Mustafa Kemal Atatürk. Little is known of Mustafa Kemal's relationship with Eleni, who fell in love with him while he was a student in Monastir (today Bitola). According to the folk story, they exchanged glances while she watched him from her balcony, but her father Eftim Karinte (also referred to in some records as Euthymios or Edrim Karintine), an Orthodox Christian wealthy merchant, did not approve of this relationship, and locked her in the house when she tried to elope. Eftim Karinte later took her to Florina, where he tried to marry her off to another man.

No documents attest this other than a letter purportedly written by Karinte.

== In popular culture ==
The love story inspired a play by Dejan Dukovski, later filmed by Aleksandar Popovski. It has also inspired a monodrama with Nikolina Vasilevska in the role of Eleni.
