= Helen (unit) =

Humorous unit of measurement for beauty

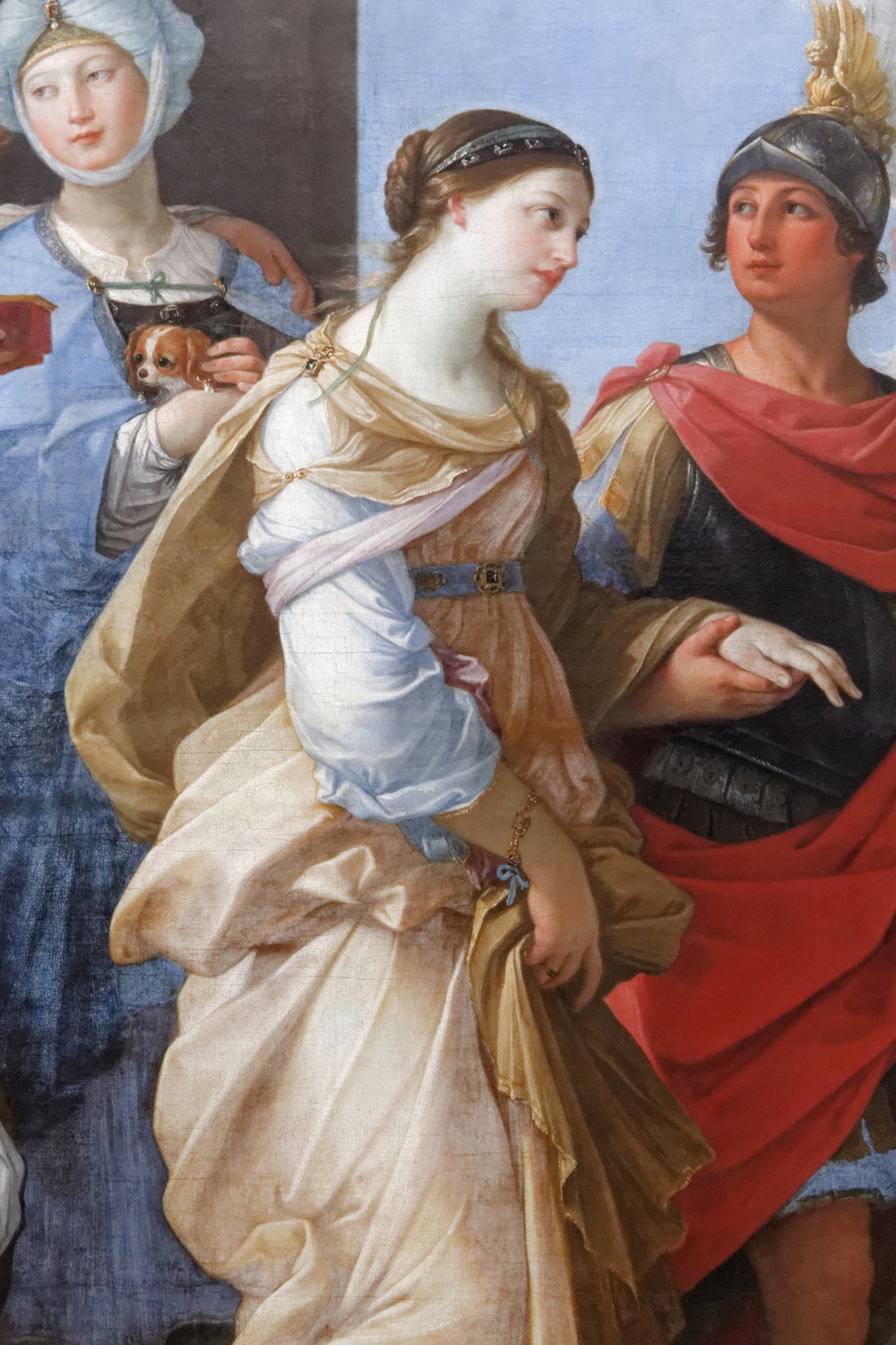
Helen leaving for Troy with Paris, as depicted by Guido Reni

A helen is a humorous unit of measurement based on the concept that Helen of Troy had a "face that launched a thousand ships". The helen is thus used to express quantities of beauty in terms of the theoretical action that could be accomplished by the wielder of such beauty.

== Origin ==
The classic reference to Helen's beauty is Christopher Marlowe's lines from the 1592 play The Tragical History of Doctor Faustus, "Was this the face that launch'd a thousand ships / And burnt the topless towers of Ilium?" In the tradition of humorous pseudounits, then, 1 millihelen is the amount of beauty needed to launch a single ship.

In his 1992 collection of jokes and limericks, Isaac Asimov claimed to have invented the term in the 1940s as a graduate student. In a 1958 letter to the New Scientist, R.C. Winton proposed the millihelen as the amount of beauty required to launch one ship. In response, P. Lockwood noted that the unit had been independently proposed by Edgar J. Westbury and extended by the pair to negative values, where −1 millihelen was the amount of ugliness required to sink a battleship.

The earliest known print citation is found in Punch magazine dated June 23, 1954 and attributed to an unnamed "professor of natural philosophy".

== Derived units ==
The Catalogue of Ships from Book II of The Iliad, which describes in detail the commanders who came to fight for Helen and the ships they brought with them, details a total of 1,186 ships which came to fight the Trojan War. As such, Helen herself has a beauty rating of 1.186 helen, capable of launching more than one thousand ships.

The "system" has been expanded by some writers, such as conceiving of negative values as measures of the ugliness required to beach a thousand ships. Writing a humorous article about the concept, David Goines considered a range of metric prefixes to the unit, ranging from the attohelen (ah) which could merely "light up a Lucky while strolling past a shipyard", to the terahelen (Th) able to "launch the equivalent of one quadrillion Greek warships and make serious inroads on the welfare of the galaxy".

Theoretical physicist Thomas Fink defines beauty in The Man's Book both in terms of ships launched and in terms of the number of women, on average, whose beauty is exceeded by one given woman. He defines one helen (H) as the quantity of beauty required to be more beautiful than 50 million women, the number of women estimated to have been alive in the 12th century BCE.

== See also ==
- List of humorous units of measurement
