= Eleni Nastouli =

Greek virologist

Eleni Nastouli FRCPCH FRCPath
- Born: Ελένη Ναστούλη; Greece
- Education: National and Kapodistrian University of Athens; University of Manchester
- Known for: Infectious diseases control
- Scientific career
- Workplaces: University College London; Imperial College London
- Website: www.uclh.nhs.uk/OurServices/Consultants/Pages/DrEleniNastouli.aspx

Eleni Nastouli (born Ελένη Ναστούλη, Greece) is a Greek clinical virologist who works at University College London Hospitals NHS Foundation Trust (UCLH) and Great Ormond Street Hospital. At UCLH, Nastouli leads the Advanced Pathogen Diagnostics Unit, where she develops technologies for genome sequencing as well as studying how viruses are transmitted around hospitals. During the COVID-19 pandemic Nastouli led an investigation into infection rates amongst healthcare workers.

== Early life and education ==
Nastouli is from Greece. She studied medicine at the National and Kapodistrian University of Athens. She moved to the United Kingdom, where she specialised in paediatrics in Manchester.

== Research and career ==
After completing her training at the University of Manchester, Nastouli joined Imperial College London, where she trained in clinical virology. She moved to University College London in 2009. At University College London Nastouli leads the Advanced Pathogen Diagnostics Unit as well as the antenatal infectious diseases clinic. She looks to support pregnant women with viral infectious diseases, including Zika ad Hepatitis B. She has investigated novel strategies to test for and treat HIV, Zika and Middle East respiratory syndrome (MERS). Nastouli is the virology consultant at Great Ormond Street Hospital.

In her capacity as lead of the Advanced Pathogen Diagnostics Unit, Nastouli uses information from genome sequencing to improve patient outcomes. Nastouli was made clinical lead for InfeCtion respONse through vIrus genomiCs (ICONIC), a programme that developed a mechanism to sequence the genome of viral pathogens as part of routine National Health Service services. ICONIC made us of next-generation sequencing in combination with electronic health records to allow physicians and policy makers to visualise outbreaks. The electronic health records provide information about a patient's journey through hospital, which makes it possible to contact-trace people who are infected with a virus. It was used to control a hospital outbreak of influenza. In 2018 ICONIC was awarded the Institution of Engineering and Technology (IET) Healthcare Technology award.

Alongside her role in ICONIC, Nastouli is a member of i-sense, a consortium that looks to identify and prevent outbreaks of infectious diseases. The consortium will support communities in low and middle-income countries, where early detection and diagnosis can transform patient outcomes. i-Sense makes use of a simple diagnostic tool that is connected to mobile phones, sending information wirelessly to healthcare systems. By mapping indicators of emerging infections, i-sense will help global public health efforts.

During the COVID-19 pandemic Nastoulli was awarded funding from the UK Research and Innovation (UKRI) to study infection rates amongst healthcare workers at UCLH. Her programme, Evaluation to Inform Response Study (SAFER), will involve frequent testing as well as monitoring of healthcare worker behavior. She hopes that SAFER will help to mitigate the coronavirus outbreak, as well as inform future pandemic management strategies. Nastouli is also contributing to Virus Watch, a project led by Andrew Hayward that will investigate the spread of coronavirus disease around the United Kingdom as well as analysing how social distancing impacts infection rates.

=== Selected publications ===
- Thomson, Emma C; Nastouli, Eleni; Main, Janice; Karayiannis, Peter; Eliahoo, Joseph; Muir, David; McClure, Myra O (2009). "Delayed anti-HCV antibody response in HIV-positive men acutely infected with HCV". AIDS. 23 (1): 89–93. doi:10.1097/qad.0b013e32831940a3. ISSN 0269-9370. PMC 2646374. PMID 19050390. Wikidata ()
- Cotten, Matthew; Lam, Tommy T.; Watson, Simon J.; Palser, Anne L.; Petrova, Velislava; Grant, Paul; Pybus, Oliver G.; Rambaut, Andrew; Guan, Yi; Pillay, Deenan; Kellam, Paul (2013). "Full-Genome Deep Sequencing and Phylogenetic Analysis of Novel Human Betacoronavirus". Emerging Infectious Diseases. 19 (5): 736–42B. doi:10.3201/eid1905.130057. hdl:10044/1/62235. ISSN 1080-6040. PMC 3647518. PMID 23693015. Wikidata ()
- Kidd, I Michael; Down, Jim; Nastouli, Eleni; Shulman, Rob; Grant, Paul R; Howell, David CJ; Singer, Mervyn (2009). "H1N1 pneumonitis treated with intravenous zanamivir". The Lancet. 374 (9694): 1036. doi:10.1016/s0140-6736(09)61528-2. ISSN 0140-6736. PMID 19733390. Wikidata ()
- Grant, Paul R; Turner, Melanie A; Shin, Gee Yen; Nastouli, Eleni; Levett, Lisa J (2020). "Extraction-free COVID-19 (SARS-CoV-2) diagnosis by RT-PCR to increase capacity for national testing programmes during a pandemic". bioRxiv 10.1101/2020.04.06.028316.

=== Awards and honours ===
Nastouli is a Fellow of the Royal College of Paediatrics and Child Health (FRCPCH) and a Fellow of the Royal College of Pathologists (FRCPath).
