= Femmes... Je vous aime =

Single by Julien Clerc

from the album Femmes, indiscrétion, blasphème
- Released: 1982
- Composer: Julien Clerc
- Lyricist: Jean-Loup Dabadie

"Femmes... Je vous aime" is a song by French singer-songwriter Julien Clerc. It was released as a single from his 1982 album Femmes, indiscrétion, blasphème.

The song is composed by Julien Clerc himself, the lyrics are by lyricist Jean-Loup Dabadie. It is one of Clerc's most famous songs.

The song is "an ode to all women". As Radio Paname! put it, its lyrics "celebrate the beauty, complexity and strength of women".

== Charts ==
Chart (1982)	Peak position
Europe (Europarade)	26
France (IFOP)	30
Quebec (Francophone charts)	11
