= SS Eleni =

A number of steamships were named Eleni, including:

- SS Eleni (1921), a British cargo ship bombed and sunk during the Spanish Civil War
- SS Eleni (1947), a Greek cargo ship in service 1959–71
