= HMS Helena =

HMS Helena has been the name of several British Royal Navy ships, and may refer to:

- HMS Atalanta (1775), a 14-gun sloop built in 1775, placed on the sale list in 1779, renamed HMS Helena in 1801 while awaiting sale, and sold in 1802
- HMS Helena (1778) was a 14-gun sloop that the Royal Navy purchased in 1778. (She may originally have been a French vessel named Hélene.) The French captured her in September 1778, and took her into service under her existing name, or perhaps as Helene. HMS Ambuscade recaptured her on 22 June 1779. A storm drove her ashore on the Dutch coast on 3 November 1796; there were no survivors.
- HMS Helena (1804), an 18-gun sloop launched in 1804 and sold in 1814
- HMS Helena (1826), a 10-gun brig-sloop ordered in 1826 but cancelled in 1831
- HMS Helena (1843), a 16-gun brig-sloop launched in 1843, hulked in 1861, and sold in 1921
- HMS Helena (1915), a drifter requisitioned from 1915 to 1919

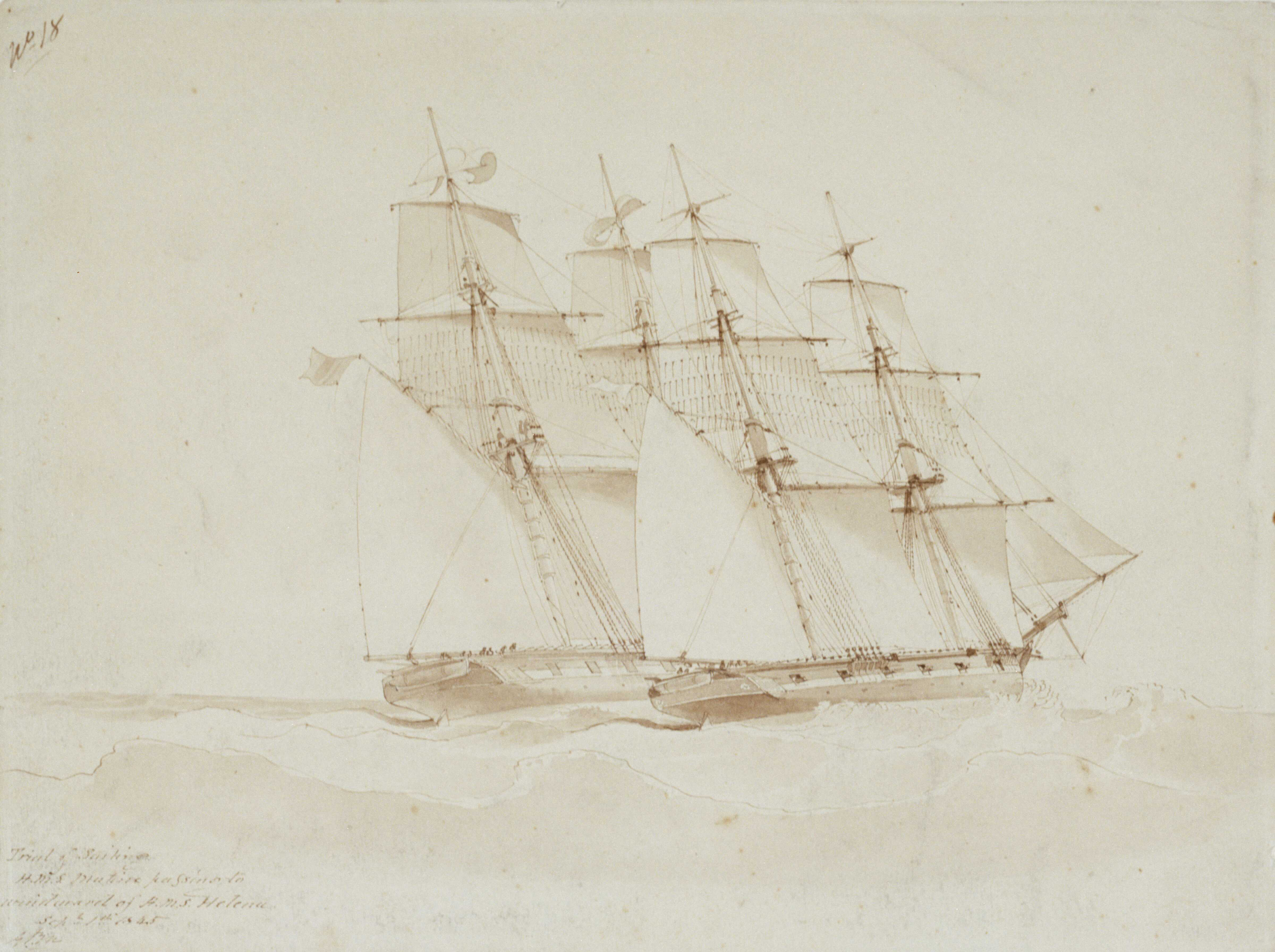
HMS Mutine passing to windward of HMS Helena in a sailing trial, 1 September 1845
