= List of storms named Ellen =

The name Ellen was used for one tropical cyclone in the Atlantic Ocean.

- Hurricane Ellen (1973)

The name Ellen was also used for twelve tropical cyclones in the Western Pacific.

- Tropical Storm Ellen (1950) (T5042)
- Typhoon Ellen (1955) (T5509)
- Typhoon Ellen (1959) (T5906, 12W) – struck Japan.
- Typhoon Ellen (1961) (T6129, 69W)
- Tropical Storm Ellen (1964) (37W, Japan Meteorological Agency analyzed it as a tropical depression, not as a tropical storm.)
- Typhoon Ellen (1967) (T6711, 12W)
- Tropical Storm Ellen (1970) (T7014, 15W, Oyang)
- Typhoon Ellen (1973) (T7306, 06W) – struck Japan. (ja)
- Tropical Storm Ellen (1976) (T7616, 16W) – struck Hong Kong.
- Typhoon Ellen (1980) (T8003, 04W)
- Typhoon Ellen (1983) (T8309, 10W, Herming) – struck the Philippines.
- Typhoon Ellen (1986) (T8620, 17W)

The name Ellen was also used for one European windstorm.

- Storm Ellen (2020) – impacted the British Isles
