= Elaine =

Elaine may refer to:

== Arts and entertainment ==
- Elaine (opera), opera composed by Herman Bemberg
- "Elaine" (short story), 1945 short story by J. D. Salinger
- "Elaine" (song), by ABBA

== Places ==
- Elaine, Victoria, a town in Australia
- Elaine, Arkansas, a US city

== People ==
- Elaine (given name), real people and fictional characters with the given name
- Elaine (legend), name shared by several different female characters in Arthurian legend, including:
  - Elaine of Astolat
  - Elaine of Corbenic
- Elaine (singer), South African singer

== See also ==
- Elaine's, a New York City restaurant
- Eleine, a Swedish metal band
- The Exploits of Elaine, 1914 film serial in the genre of The Perils of Pauline
- "Miss Elaine", song by Run–D.M.C. from the album Tougher Than Leather
