= USS Helena I =

Patrol vessel of the United States Navy

History

United States
- Name: USS Helena I
- Namesake: Previous name retained
- Builder: Van Sant Brothers, Port Republic, New Jersey
- Completed: 1906
- Acquired: May 1917
- Commissioned: 7 September 1917
- Decommissioned: 27 August 1919
- Stricken: 4 October 1919
- Fate: Sold, 27 August 1919; Wrecked prior to delivery to new owner, 11 September 1919
- Notes: Operated as private motor yacht Helena I 1906-1917

General characteristics
- Type: Patrol vessel
- Displacement: 9 long tons (9 t)
- Length: 43 ft (13 m)
- Beam: 10 ft (3.0 m)
- Draft: 3 ft (0.91 m) (mean)
- Speed: 10 kn (12 mph; 19 km/h)
- Armament: 1 × machine gun

USS Helena I (SP-24) was an armed yacht that served the United States Navy as a patrol vessel from 1917 to 1919.

Helena I was built in 1906 by the Van Sant Brothers, Port Republic, New Jersey, as a private motor yacht. The U.S. Navy acquired her from Dr. W. G. Hall of Trenton, New Jersey, in May 1917 for World War I service. Assigned to the 7th Naval District, she was taken to Key West, Florida, and commissioned as the USS Helena I (SP-24) on 7 September 1917.

Helena I operated as a harbor and coastal patrol boat in the vicinity of Key West, until decommissioned and sold on 27 August 1919. Before she could be delivered to her new owner, however, Helena I was among eight former SP boats wrecked on 11 September by the 1919 Florida Keys Hurricane, while anchored in the North Beach Basin, Key West. She was stricken from the Naval Vessel Register on 4 October 1919
