= Lake Ellen (Minnesota) =

Lake in the state of Minnesota, United States

- Location within Minnesota
- Location: Chisago County, Minnesota
- Coordinates: 45°21′57″N 92°54′23″W
- Type: lake

Lake Ellen is a lake in Chisago County, Minnesota, in the United States.

Lake Ellen was named for an early settler.

== See also ==
- List of lakes in Minnesota
