= Lake Ellen (Wisconsin) =

Lake in Sheboygan County, Wisconsin, United States

- Location within Wisconsin Location within the United States
- Location: Sheboygan County, Wisconsin
- Coordinates: 43°38′46″N 088°00′54″W
- Basin countries: United States
- Surface area: 121 acres (0.49 km^{2})
- Max. depth: 42 ft (13 m)
- Surface elevation: 837 ft (255 m)

Lake Ellen is a lake located near Cascade, Wisconsin, approximately 44 miles (71 km) northwest of Milwaukee, and is a 121-acre (0.49 km^{2}) lake with a maximum depth of 42 feet (13 m). Used for recreational boating, fishing and swimming, it is surrounded by cabins and small cottages. The lake is also home to largemouth bass, northern pike and panfish, including bluegills, crappies, yellow perch, pumpkinseed sunfish, rock bass and white bass. The Department of Natural Resources stocks about 12,000 walleye fingerlings every other year.
