= Julien Clerc =

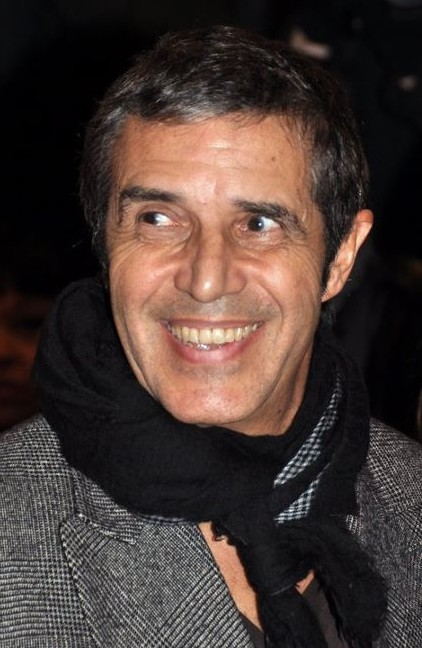
- Clerc in 2011

Background information
- Born: Paul-Alain Auguste Leclerc; 4 October 1947 (age 79); Paris, France
- Genres: Pop, Chanson
- Occupations: Singer, songwriter, pianist
- Instrument: Piano
- Years active: 1969–present
- Labels: Pathé Marconi; Virgin
- Website: Official website

Paul-Alain Auguste Leclerc (born 4 October 1947), better known by his stage name Julien Clerc (pronounced [ʒyljɛ̃ klɛʁ]), is a French singer-songwriter.

He rose to fame with his song "La cavalerie" (1968), that captured the "rebellious essence" of those times and became an anthem of the French youth. Among Clerc's most known songs are "Ce n'est rien" (1971), "Si on chantait" (1972), "Ma préférence" (1978), "Femmes... Je vous aime" (1982), "Mélissa" (1984), "Hélène" (1987), "Fais-moi une place" (1990).

== Life ==
Born in the 19th arrondissement of Paris, Clerc grew up listening to classical music in his father Paul Leclerc's home, while his mother Évelyne Merlot introduced him to the music of such singers as Georges Brassens and Edith Piaf. He began to learn the piano at six, and by 13, started to play by ear everything he heard on the radio.

During his secondary school and university days, he met Maurice Vallet and Etienne Roda-Gil, two of his main songwriters, and began to compose his first songs. He changed his name to Julien Clerc upon signing a contract with Pathé Marconi, releasing his first album in May 1968.

The album went on to win the Académie Charles Cros Record Award. In 1969, Clerc went on the Olympia stage for the first time to open for Gilbert Becaud's concert. Despite having been in show business for only one year, his performance was a great success. He would later return repeatedly to the Olympia for a series of concerts.

From May 1969 to February 1970, he starred in the highly successful Paris run of the musical Hair, which increased his profile.

By the age of 24, Clerc was a major star and had recorded numerous hits, many of which were sold abroad, translated and distributed in other languages.

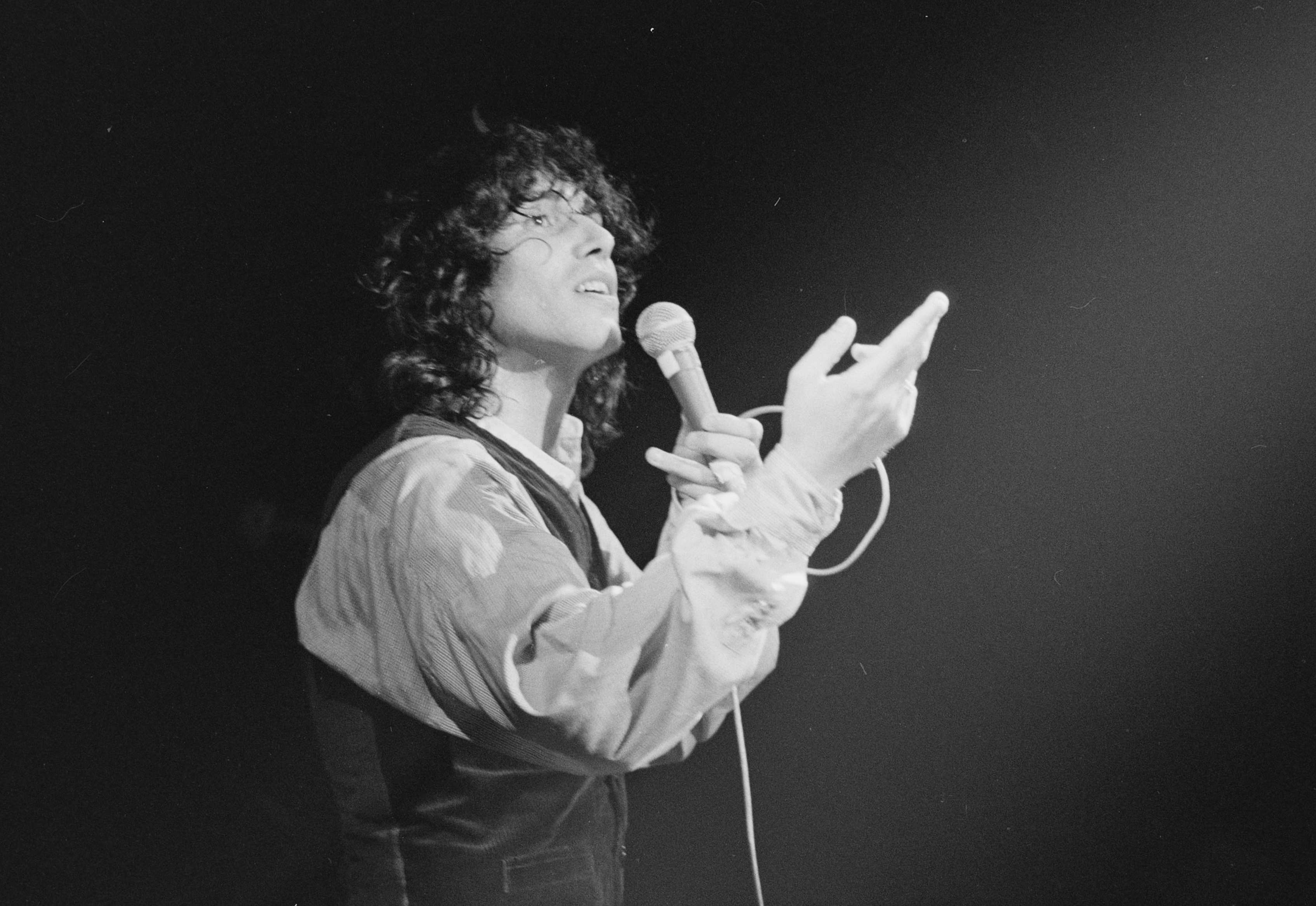
Julien Clerc in Amsterdam, 1976

In 1979, he took part in two new collaborative ventures, singing the title song of the children's musical, "Emilie Jolie" and participating in "36 Front Populaire", a double album musical about a turbulent historical period. Over the years, Clerc's repertoire has ranged from his own compositions to classic French songs like "Comme Hier" by Brassens and "L'hymne à l'amour" by Edith Piaf. He has performed in Africa, the Americas and Europe.

In January 1999, Clerc went on stage at the Théâtre des Champs-Elysées and delivered an unplugged acoustic set that was a long way from the rock/pop-based shows that he had been giving his audience for some years. In 2000, he appeared, along with many other artists, in a number of benefit concerts for Restaurants du Coeur, a winter food bank charity.

In 2003, Clerc recorded a new album of classic American "standards", in French. On another front, Clerc was named UNHCR Goodwill Ambassador at a ceremony in Paris in November 2003 after working for nearly two years with the agency on various benevolent projects for refugees. In March 2004, he undertook his first field mission to meet with refugees and aid workers in Chad. His mission was documented by Envoyé spécial and was broadcast on a national French TV channel in April 2004.

== Family ==
Clerc has five children: daughters Angèle (adopted) and Jeanne Herry with French actress Miou-Miou; daughter Vanille and son Barnabé with then-wife Virginie Coupérie; and son Léonard with Hélène Grémillon, whom he married in 2012.

== Awards ==
- 1974: Five golden records

== Discography ==
- 1969: Julien Clerc
- 1970: Des jours entiers à t'aimer
- 1971: Julien Clerc
- 1972: Liberté, égalité, fraternité ... ou la mort
- 1973: Julien
- 1974: Terre de France
- 1974: N°7
- 1976: A mon âge et à l'heure qu'il est
- 1978: Jaloux
- 1980: Clerc Julien
- 1980: Sans entracte
- 1982: Femmes, indiscrétion, blasphème
- 1984: Aime-moi
- 1987: Les aventures à l'eau
- 1990: Fais-moi une place
- 1992: Utile
- 1997: Julien
- 2000: Si j'étais elle
- 2003: Studio
- 2005: Double enfance
- 2008: Où s'en vont les avions ?
- 2011: Fou, Peut-être
- 2014: Partout la musique vient
- 2017: À nos amours
- 2021: Terrien
- 2021: Les jours heureux
- 2025 : Une vie
