= Hélène (Julien Clerc song) =

Single by Julien Clerc

from the album Liberté, égalité, fraternité... ou la mort
- Released: 1972
- Composer(s): Julien Clerc

"Hélène" is a song by French singer-songwriter Julien Clerc. It was included on his 1987 album Les aventures à l'eau and was released as the third single from it.

== Background ==
The song was written by Julien Clerc and David McNeil. The recording was produced by Mike Howlett.

== Charts ==
Chart (1987)	Peak position
Belgium (Ultratop 50 Flanders)	2
France (SNEP)	11
Netherlands (Dutch Top 40)	5
Netherlands (Single Top 100)	8
