= Helene (name) =

- Pronunciation: French: [elɛn]
- Gender: Female

Origin
- Origin: Greek

Other names
- Related names: Helen, Helena, Elene, Elena, Elaine, Hellen, Ellen, Eleni

Helene (French: Hélène) is a female given name, a French variant of Helen. Helen is ultimately from Greek Ἑλένη.

The name is used in many other languages. Name days: Hungary (as Helén) – October 14, Estonia – August 18, Greece (as Ελένη) – May 21.

== People with the given name Helene ==
- Duchess Helene of Mecklenburg-Schwerin (1814–1858), Duchess of Orléans
- Princess Hélène of Orléans (1871–1951), Duchess of Aosta, second daughter of Prince Philippe, Count of Paris
- Duchess Helene in Bavaria (1834–1890), Hereditary Princess of Thurn and Taxis
- Duchess Helene of Mecklenburg-Strelitz (1857–1936), great-granddaughter of Paul I of Russia
- Hélène Adant (1903–1985), Russian-born French philosopher
- Hélène Agofroy (born 1953), French artist
- Hélène Ahrweiler (1926–2026), Greek Byzantinologist
- Hélène Aholou Keke, Beninese lawyer and politician
- Hélène Alarie (1941–2023), Canadian politician
- Helene Aldwinckle (1920–2020), British translator and gallerist
- Heléne Alexopoulos, American ballet dancer
- Hélène Marie Antigna (1837–1918), French painter
- Helena Antipoff (1892–1974), Brazilian psychologist
- Hélène Arpels, French model and shoe designer
- Helène Aylon (1931–2020), American multimedia, eco-feminist artist and educator
- Hélène Baillargeon (1916–1997), Canadian singer, actor and folklorist
- Hélène Barcelo (born 1954), Canadian-American mathematician
- Hélène de Beauvoir (1910–2001), French painter
- Helene Bechstein (1876–1951), German socialite and businesswoman
- Hélène Bellosta (1946–2011), French historian of mathematics
- Hélène Benichou-Safar, French historian, archaeologist, epigraphist and Semiticist
- Helene Thomas Bennett (1901–1988), American bacteriologist and businesswoman
- Helene Benveniste, Danish academic
- Hélène Bergès (born 1966), French biologist
- Helene Bergsholm (born 1992), Norwegian actress
- Hélène Berr (1921–1945), French note writer
- Hélène Bertaux (1825–1909), French sculptor and women's rights advocate
- Helene Bielansky (born 1931), Austrian hurdler
- Helene Billgren (born 1952), Swedish artist
- Hélène Binet, Swiss-French architectural photographer
- Hélène Bischler (1932–2005), French botanist and bryologist
- Hélène Bizot (born 1973), French actress
- Heléne Björklund (born 1972), Swedish politician
- Helene Blum, Danish folk music singer
- Helene Böhlau (1859–1940), German writer
- Hélène Boivin (born 1959), Canadian swimmer
- Helene Bøksle (born 1981), Norwegian singer and actress
- Helene von Bolváry (1892–1943), Hungarian actress
- Hélène Bons (1903–1999), French high jumper
- Hélène Boschi (1917–1990), Franco-Swiss pianist
- Hélène Boucher (1908–1934), French pilot
- Hélène Bouchet (born 1980), French ballet dancer
- Hélène Bouchez, French conductor
- Hélène Bouchiat (born 1958), French physicist
- Hélène Boudreau (born 1969), Canadian children's author
- Hélène Bourdages (born 1959), Canadian fencer
- Hélène Bourgault (1945–2006), Canadian video and film artist
- Hélène Bourgeois Leclerc (born 1974), Canadian actress
- Hélène Bouvier (1905–1978), French operatic mezzo-soprano
- Helene Brandt (1936–2013), American sculptor
- Hélène Brasseur (born 2002), Belgian field hockey player
- Helene Brehm (1862–1932), German poet and teacher
- Hélène Breschand (born 1966), French harpist and composer
- Helene Bresslau Schweitzer (1879–1957), German medical missionary, nurse, social worker, linguist, public medicine enthusiast, editor, feminist, sociologist and wife of Albert Schweitzer
- Helene von Breuning (1750–1838), German noblewoman
- Hélène Brion (1882–1962), French socialist feminist
- Helene Hathaway Britton (1879–1950), American baseball executive
- Hélène Brodeur (1923–2010), Canadian writer
- Helene Darrell Brown, Bermudian politician
- Helene Liliendahl Brydensholt (born 1987), Danish politician
- Helene Budliger Artieda, Swiss diplomat
- Hélène Cadou (1922–2014), French poet and writer
- Hélène Campbell (born 1991), Canadian activist
- Hélène Carrère d'Encausse (1929–2023), French historian
- Hélène Cazès-Benatar (1898–1979), Moroccan Jewish lawyer and human rights activist
- Hélène Cedet (born 1965), French tennis player
- Helene Chadwick (1897–1940), American actress
- Hélène Chanel (born 1941), French actress
- Hélène Châtelain (1935–2020), French actress
- Helene Christaller (1872–1953), German Protestant writer
- Helene Chung Martin (born 1945), Australian journalist
- Hélène Cixous (born 1937), French writer
- Helene Clarkson, Canadian actress
- Helene S. Coleman (1925–2021), former president of the National Council of Jewish Women in United States of America
- Hélène Connart (born 1988), Belgian kickboxer
- Hélène Contostavlos (1903–1963), French-born Greek tennis player
- Hélène Conway-Mouret (born 1960), French politician
- Helene Cooper (born 1966), Liberian-born American journalist
- Hélène Cortin (born 1972), French rower
- Helene Costello (1906–1957), American actress
- Hélène Courtois, French astrophysicist
- Helene Cramer (1844–1916), German painter
- Helene Cronin, American singer-songwriter
- Hélène Cuenat (1931–2022), French anti-colonial activist
- Hélène Cuvigny, French historian
- Heléne Dahlberg (born 1971), Swedish biathlete
- Helene von Damm (born 1938), Austrian-born American diplomat
- Hélène Daneault (born 1961), Canadian politician
- Hélène Darly (1900–1994), French actress
- Hélène Darroze (born 1967), French chef
- Hélène David (born 1953), Canadian politician
- Hélène Defrance (born 1986), French sailor
- Hélène Delmée (born 1987), Belgian field hockey player
- Helene Demuth (1820–1890), housekeeper of Karl Marx
- Hélène Deschamps Adams (1921–2006), United States intelligence agency member
- Hélène Desputeaux (born 1959), Canadian educator, writer and illustrator
- Helene Deutsch (1884–1982), American psychoanalyst
- Helene Diamantides, fell runner
- Hélène Diarra (c. 1955–2021), Malian actress
- Hélène R. Dickel, American astronomer
- Helene Dietrich (born 1960), German footballer
- Helene Dillard, American plant pathologist
- Helene Dolgoruki (1789–1860), Russian noblewoman
- Hélène Dorion (born 1958), Canadian poet and writer
- Helene von Druskowitz (1856–c. 1918), Austrian philosopher, writer and music critic
- Hélène Dubreuil (born 1967), French set decorator
- Hélène Duc (1917–2014), French actress
- Helene Duhamel, American politician and judge
- Hélène Durand (1883–1934), Belgian botanist and botanical artist
- Hélène Dutrieu (1877–1961), French cyclist, stunt driver and aviator
- Hélène Edlund (1858–1941), Swedish photographer
- Hélène Egger (1929–2024), Dutch Holocaust survivor
- Helene Elliott, American sportswriter
- Helene von Engelhardt (1850–1910), Baltic German poet, writer and translator
- Helene Engelmann (1898–1985), Austrian pair skater
- Hélène Esnault (born 1953), French mathematician
- Hélène Ezanno (born 1984), French rugby union player
- Hélène Fargier, French computer scientist
- Helene Gigstad Fauske (born 1997), Norwegian handball player
- Hélène Feillet (c. 1812–1889), French lithographer and painter
- Hélène Fercocq (born 1998), French association footballer
- Helene Ferris, first second-career female rabbi
- Helene Fesenmaier (1937–2013), American painter and sculptor
- Hélène Fillières (born 1972), French actress, film director and screenwriter
- Helene Fischer (born 1984), German singer
- Helene Fladmark (born 1966), Norwegian politician
- Hélène Flautre (born 1958), French politician
- Helene Fleischer (1899–1941), German politician
- Hélène Fleury-Roy (1876–1957), French composer
- Hélène Florent (born 1974), Canadian actress
- Helene P. Foley (born 1942), American classical philosopher
- Helene von Forster (1859–1923), German women's rights activist
- Helene Fortunoff (1933–2021), American businesswoman
- Hélène de Fougerolles (born 1973), French actress
- Hélène Franco (born 1971), French magistrate and politician
- Helene Frank, Danish singer
- Hélène Frankowska, Polish and French mathematician
- Heléne Fritzon (born 1960), Swedish politician
- Helene Funke (1869–1957), German painter
- Hélène Gassin (born 1975), French politician
- Helene D. Gayle (born 1955), American pediatric and humanitarian
- Helene Auguste Geisen-Volk, American serial killer
- Hélène Geoffroy (born 1970), French politician
- Hélène Gestern (born 1971), French writer
- Hélène de Gingins (1828–1905), Swiss salonnière and feminist
- Hélène Girard, Canadian film editor
- Hélène Gordon-Lazareff (1909–1988), French journalist
- Hélène Goudin (born 1956), Swedish politician
- Helene Granqvist (born 1970), Swedish curler
- Hélène Grémillon (born 1977), French writer
- Hélène Grenier (1900–1992), Canadian librarian
- Hélène Grimaud (born 1969), French pianist
- H. A. Guerber (1859–1929), American writer
- Helene Guerin, French opera composer
- Helene Hagan, American anthropologist
- Helene Hale (1918–2013), American politician
- Helene Hanff (1916–1997), American dramatist
- Helene Hansen (sailor) (born 1968), Danish sailor
- Hélène Harbec (born 1946), Canadian writer
- Hélène Harder, French-German director
- Hélène Hatzfeld (born 1950), French political scientist
- Helene Hayman, Baroness Hayman (born 1949), British politician
- Helene Hecht (1854–1940), German art collector
- Helene Hegemann (born 1992), German writer, director and actress
- Helene Hellmark Knutsson (born 1969), Swedish politician
- Hélène Hendriks (born 1980), Dutch television presenter
- Helene Herzbrun (1921–1984), American painter
- Hélène Hesters (born 2005), Belgian cyclist
- Helene Hewitt, British climate scientist
- Helene Hibben (1882–1968), American sculptor
- Hélène Hillion-Guillemin (born 1969), French footballer
- Helene Holzman (1891–1968), German painter and author
- Helene Hovanec, American children's puzzle book writer
- Hélène Huart (born 1965), French hurdler
- Hélène Huby, French rocket and space scientist
- Hélène Iswolsky (1896–1975), Russian noblewoman, anti-communist political refugee, writer, translator and journalist
- Helene Jarmer (born 1971), Austrian politician
- Hélène Jégado (1803–1852), French serial killer
- Helene Jensen, Danish curler
- Helene Johnson (1906–1995), American poet
- Helene Jonsson (born 1971), Swedish curler
- Hélène Jourdan-Morhange (1888–1961), French violinist
- Hélène Joy (born 1978), Australian actress
- Helene Jung (1887–1975), German opera singer
- Helene J. Kantor (1919–1993), American architect
- Helene Kappler (born 1973), Venezuelan tennis player
- Helene Karastoyanova (born 1933), Bulgarian composer
- Hélène Karbanov (born 2004), French rhythmic gymnast
- Hélène Kaziende (born 1967), Nigerian educator, journalist and writer
- Helene Keeley (born 1965), American politician
- Helene Khatskels (1882–1973), Yiddish children's educator and writer
- Helene Kindberg (born 1998), Danish handball player
- Helene Kirkegaard (born 1971), Danish badminton player
- Helene Kirsch (1906–1999), German politician
- Helene Koch (born 1967), Swedish professional golfer
- Helene Koppejan (1927–1998), Dutch astrologer and entrepreneur
- Hélène Koscielniak, Canadian novelist
- Hélene Kotchoubey (1812–1888), Russian noblewoman
- Helene Kottanner, Hungarian courtier and writer
- Helene Kröller-Müller (1869–1939), German art collector
- Helene Amalie Krupp (1732–1810), German industrialist
- Helene Kullman (1920–1943), Estonian intelligence agent
- Helene Kulsrud (1933–2025), computer scientist
- Hélène Labarrière (born 1963), French jazz musician
- Hélène Lam Trong, French documentary filmmaker
- Hélène Landemore, French political scientist
- Helene Langevin, American neurological scientist
- Hélène Langevin-Joliot (born 1927), French physicist
- Helene Lapierre, research scientist for Agriculture and Agri-Food Canada
- Hélène Laporte (born 1978), French politician
- Hélène Laverdière (born 1955), Canadian politician
- Hélène Le Gal (born 1967), French diplomat
- Hélène LeBlanc (born 1958), Canadian politician
- Helene Lecher (1865–1929), Austrian philanthropist
- Hélène Ledoux (born 1963), French rower
- Hélène Lee, French journalist
- Hélène Lefebvre (born 1991), French rower
- Hélène Lenoir (born 1955), French writer
- Helene Liebmann (1795–1835), German pianist and composer
- Hélène Lindqvist, Swedish singer
- Hélène Lipietz (born 1958), French politician
- Hélène Loiselle (1928–2013), Canadian actress
- Hélène Louvart (born 1964), French cinematographer
- Hélène Mallebrancke (1902–1940), Belgian civil engineer, member of Belgian Resistance during the Second World War
- Hélène Mandroux (born 1940), French politician
- Hélène Mannarino (born 1990), French journalist, television and radio presenter
- Countess Hélène Mannerheim (1842–1881), Finnish noblewoman
- Hélène Martin (1928–2021), French singer-songwriter
- Hélène Martini (1924–2017), French theater director
- Hélène Massam (1949–2020), Canadian statistician
- Hélène Masson-Maret (born 1947), French politician
- Helene Mayer (1910–1953), German and American Olympic champion foil fencer
- Hélène Mercier-Arnault (born 1960), Canadian concert pianist
- Helene Meyers, American writer and professor
- Hélène Miard-Delacroix (born 1959), French historian, Germanist, professor
- Hélène Michel-Wolfromm, French gynecologist
- Helene Michelson (born 1906, date of death unknown), Estonian figure skater
- Helene Migerka (1867–1928), Austrian poet and novelist
- Hélène Mignon (born 1934), French politician
- Helene Millard (1905–1974), American actress
- Helene Minkin (1873–1954), Russian-Jewish anarchist
- Hélène Missoffe (1927–2015), French politician
- Helene Mitterstieler, Italian luger
- Helene Moglen (1936–2018), American feminist scholar and author
- Hélène Monastier (1882–1976), Swiss peace activist and teacher
- Hélène de Monferrand, French novelist
- Hélène de Montgeroult (1764–1836), French pianist and composer
- Hélène Napoleone de Montholon (1816–c. 1907), reputed daughter of Napoleon
- Hélène Morlon (born 1978), French mathematician and ecologist
- Helene Moszkiewiez (1920–1998), Jewish Belgian double agent
- Helene Muller (born 1978), South African swimmer
- Helene Muller-Landau, American ecologist
- Helene Mullins (1899–1991), American poet
- Helene Muri, Norwegian climate scientist
- Helene Næss (born 1991), Norwegian sailor
- Hélène Nautré (1904–1976), French woman resistance fighter and politician
- Helene Nayituriki, Rwandan Catholic nun
- Hélène Noesmoen (born 1992), French windsurfer
- Helene Nonné-Schmidt (1891–1976), German textile artist
- Helene Odilon (1865–1939), German stage actress
- Hélène Oettingen (1887–1950), French painter and poet
- Helene Olafsen (born 1990), Norwegian former snowboarder
- Helene Ollendorff Curth (1899–1982), American dermatologist
- Hélène Olivier-Bourbigou (born 1962), French chemist and engineer
- Helene Overlach (1894–1983), German politician
- Helene Palmer (1928–2011), English actress
- Hélène Papper, French international executive leader
- Hélène Parisot (born 1992), French athlete
- Hélène Parmelin (1915–1998), French novelist and art critic
- Hélène Pastor (1937–2014), heiress and businesswoman from Monaco
- Hélène Pedneault (1952–2008), Canadian writer
- Hélène Pelletier (born 1959), Canadian tennis player
- Hélène Pelletier-Baillargeon (1932–2025), Canadian journalist and writer
- Helene Pellicano (born 2002), Maltese tennis player
- Hélène Pelosse (born 1970), French official
- Hélène Perdriat (1894–1969), French painter
- Hélène Perdrière (1912–1992), French actress
- Hélène Perrin (born 1972), French physicist
- Hélène Persson (born 1966), Swedish figure skater
- Helene Petersson (born 1956), Swedish politician
- Hélène Jawhara Piñer, French-Spanish historian
- Helene Polatajko, Canadian occupation therapist
- Hélène de Portes (c. 1902–1940), French woman; lover of Paul Reynaud
- Helene Postranecky (1903–1995), Austrian politician
- Hélène de Pourtalès (1868–1945), Swiss sailor
- Helene Quilter, New Zealand public servant
- Hélène Raguénès (born 2000), French canoeist
- Hélène Ramjiawan (1952–2021), Surinamese writer
- Helene Rask (born 1980), Norwegian model
- Helene Raynsford (born 1979), British Paralympic rower
- Hélène Receveaux (born 1991), French judoka
- Hélène Rémy (born 1932), French actress
- Hélène Rey, French economist
- Helene Reynard (1875–1947), UK economist and college administrator
- Hélène Ricardo (born 1974), French swimmer
- Hélène Rioux (born 1949), Canadian writer and translator
- Helene Ripa (born 1971), Swedish Paralympic athlete
- Helene Ritchie (born 1945), New Zealand politician
- Hélène Rivier (1902–1986), Swiss librarian
- Hélène Robert (politician) (born 1945), Canadian politician
- Hélène Robert (actress) (1910–1981), French actress
- Hélène Robert-Mazel, French composer
- Hélène Rochette, Canadian artist
- Hélène Rollès (born 1966), French singer
- Helene Rønningen (born 1998), Norwegian sprinter
- Helene Rosson (1897–1985), American actress
- Helene Rother, American female industrialist
- Helene Rothländer (1890–1976), German politician and educator
- Hélène Rousseaux (born 1991), Belgian volleyball player
- Hélène Roussel (1932–2022), French actress
- Hélène Ruiz Fabri, French jurist and Professor of Law
- Hélène Ryckmans (born 1959), Belgian politician
- Hélène Rytmann (1910–1980), French revolutionary and sociologist
- Hélène de Saint Lager (born 1957), French artist and sculptor
- Hélène de Saint-Père (1963–2022), French actress
- Helene Sandvig (born 1968), Norwegian journalist
- Hélène Sardeau (1899–1969), American sculptor
- Hélène Scherrer (born 1950), Canadian politician
- Helene Scheu-Riesz (1880–1970), Austrian activist and writer
- Helene Schjerfbeck (1862–1946), Finnish artist
- Helene Schlanzowsky-Grekowska, Polish-Austrian ballet dancer
- Hélène Schmitt, French musician
- Helene Schmitz (born 1960), Swedish photographer
- Helene Schneider (born 1970), American politician
- Hélène Schwab (1878–1954), French painter
- Helene Sedlmayr (1813–1898), German beauty
- Hélène Ségara (born 1971), French singer
- Helene Sensburg, German radio propagandist
- Hélène Seuzaret (born 1976), French actress
- Hélène Simard (born 1965), Canadian wheelchair basketball player
- Helene J. Sinnreich, US historian and academic
- Hélène Smith (1861–1929), French occultist
- Helene Söderlund (born 1987), Swedish ski-orienteer
- Hélène Solomon-Langevin (1909–1995), French politician
- Hélène Sosnowska (1864–1942), Polish-French gynecologist
- Hélène Sparrow (1891–1970), Polish microbiologist and public health pioneer
- Helene Spilling (born 1996), Norwegian dancer
- Helene Stähelin (1891–1970), Swiss mathematician, teacher and peace activist
- Helene Stanley (1929–1990), American actress
- Helene Stanton (1925–2017), American actress
- Helene Steed (born 1970), Irish Anglican priest
- Helene Stöcker (1869–1943), German feminist, pacifist and gender activist
- Helene Marie Stromeyer (1834–1924), German painter
- Hélène de Suzannet (1901–1961), French politician
- Hélène Swarth (1859–1941), Dutch poet
- Helene Taube (1860–1930), Baltic German noblewoman
- Helene von Taussig (1879–1942), Austrian artist
- Hélène Tétreault (1958–2025), Canadian handball player
- Helene Thimig (1889–1974), Austrian actress
- Hélène Thouy (born 1983), French politician
- Helene Thurner (born 1938), Austrian luger
- Hélène Tigroudja (born 1975), French jurist and international law expert
- Hélène Tréheux-Duchêne (born 1963), French diplomat
- Helene Tschitschko (1908–1992), Austrian politician
- Helene Turner, American film editor
- Helene Tursten (born 1954), Swedish writer
- Hélène Tysman (born 1982), French classical pianist
- Helene Udy (born 1962), American actress
- Helene Uri (born 1964), Norwegian linguist, novelist and children's writer
- Hélène Vachon, Canadian writer
- Hélène Vainqueur-Christophe (born 1956), French politician
- Helene Vannari (1948–2022), Estonian actress
- Hélène Velasco-Graciet, French academic
- Helene von Vetsera (1847–1925), Austrian noblewoman
- Hélène Vincent (born 1943), French actress and stage director
- Helene Voigt-Diederichs (1875–1961), German writer
- Helene Walsh, American politician
- Helene Warne (1894–1993), British film editor
- Helene Weber (1881–1962), German politician and activist
- Helene Wecker (born 1975), American speculative fiction writer
- Helene Weigel (1900–1971), Austrian actress and artist
- Helene Weinstein (born 1952), American politician
- Helene Weiss (1898–c. 1951), German philosopher
- Helene Wessel (1898–1969), German politician
- Helene Weyl (1893–1948), German translator
- Hélène Wezeu Dombeu (born 1987), Cameroonian judoka
- Helene White (born 1954), American judge
- Helene Whitney (1914–1990), American actress
- Helene Whittaker (born 1958), Norwegian-Canadian architect
- Helene Wiese (1828–1862), Norwegian actress and singer
- Helene Wiet (1871–c. 1939), Austrian soprano
- Helene Wildbrunn (1882–1972), Austrian opera singer
- Helene Winer, American art gallery owner and curator
- Helene Winterstein-Kambersky (1900–1966), Austrian singer and inventor
- Helene Billing Wurlitzer (1874–1963), American philanthropist
- Heléne Yorke (born 1985), Canadian actress
- Helene Young, Australian author
- Hélène Zannier (born 1972), French politician
- Hélène van Zuylen (1863–1947), French author and member of the prominent Rothschild banking family

== Classical figures ==
- Helen of Troy, the daughter of Zeus and Leda
- Helene, a figure in Greek mythology who was a friend of Aphrodite and helped her seduce Adonis
- Helene, a daughter of Tityrus and an Amazon who fought Achilles and died after he seriously wounded her
- Helene, the consort of Simon Magus in Adversus Haereses
