= Elizabeth Abel =

American literary scholar

Elizabeth Abel (born 1945) is an American literary scholar who, as of 2024, holds the John F. Hotchkis Chair in English at the University of California, Berkeley.

== Biography ==
Abel holds the John F. Hotchkis Chair in English at the University of California, Berkeley. Her general research interests include both British and American modern fiction, with particular interests in feminist theory, psychoanalysis, Virginia Woolf, race, and gender. She got her PhDis also from Princeton in 1975. She was an assistant professor at the University of Chicago in 1982 and received the University's Distinguished Teaching award in 1997. She is also a longtime contributor and editorial board member of Critical Inquiry academic journal.

== Research and writing ==
Abel gives her research areas (as of 2024) as "gender and sexuality, psychoanalysis, and twentieth-century fiction" particularly Virginia Woolf, and "race, cultural studies, and visuality".

In 1981 she was guest editor for a special issue of Critical Inquiry, 'Writing and Sexual Difference'. According to Kathryn West in Abel's entry in the Encyclopedia of Feminist Literary Theory, the essays marked a shift in feminist literary theory from "recovering a lost tradition to discovering the terms of confrontation with the dominant tradition", by means of "specific historical studies of the ways women revise prevailing themes and styles".

Abel's Virginia Woolf and the Fictions of Psychoanalysis (1989), an "important study" of the author Virginia Woolf, relates Woolf's work to 1920s social anthropology and the psychoanalytic theories of Sigmund Freud and Melanie Klein. According to the academic Lisa Ruddick, Abel shows that Woolf "absorbed many of Freud's insights" on gender identity, but simultaneously "inflected them in a manner that we would now call feminist".

Her later books include Signs of the Times: The Visual Politics of Jim Crow (2010), a "well-researched, insightful book" on the "aesthetics of signs" associated with racial segregation in the United States; in a generally positive review for The Journal of American History, Christopher P. Lehman criticizes Abel for failing to interview surviving activists. Ulrich Adelt describes the book as the "first comprehensive study" of the subject but writes that it "occasionally borders on over-interpretation" of the images analyzed.

Abel in 1999 received a $20,000 fellowship from the George A. and Eliza Gardner Howard foundation to support her research project Signs of the Times: The Visual Politics of Jim Crow. She was among 11 fellows selected from a pool of 160 candidates.

== Works ==
Authored books

- Virginia Woolf and the Fictions of Psychoanalysis. Chicago: University of Chicago Press, 1989.
- Signs of the Times: The Visual Politics of Jim Crow. Berkeley: University of California Press, 2010.
- Odd Affinities: Virginia Woolf's Shadow Genealogies. Chicago: University of Chicago Press, 2024.

Edited books

- (ed.) Writing and Sexual Difference. Chicago: University of Chicago Press, 1982.
- (ed. with Marianne Hirsch and Elizabeth Langland) The Voyage in: fictions of female development. Hanover, NH : Published for Dartmouth College by University Press of New England, 1983
- (ed. with Emily K. Abel) The Signs reader: women, gender, & scholarship. Chicago: University of Chicago Press, 1983.
- (ed. with Barbara Christian and Helene Moglen) Female subjects in black and white: race, psychoanalysis, feminism. Berkeley: University of California Press, 1997.
