= Moglen =

Moglen is a surname. Notable people with the surname include:

- Eben Moglen (born 1959), American professor
- Helene Moglen (born 1936), American feminist literary scholar and author
