= Massam =

Massam is a surname. Notable people with the surname include:

- David Massam, New Zealand Antarctic explorer, namesake of Mount Massam and the Massam Glacier
- Diane Massam, Canadian linguist
- Hélène Massam, Canadian statistician
- Rob Massam (born 1987), Welsh international rugby league footballer

== See also ==
- Massam's South African dessert candy
- Massam, principal town of the Kpaka Chiefdom in Sierra Leone
