= Knowledge sharing =

Activity through which knowledge is exchanged

Knowledge sharing or skill sharing is an activity through which knowledge (namely, information, skills, or expertise) is exchanged among people, friends, peers, families, communities (for example, Wikipedia), or within or between organizations. It bridges the individual and organizational knowledge, improving the absorptive and innovation capacity and thus leading to sustained competitive advantage of companies as well as individuals. Knowledge sharing is part of the knowledge management process.

Apart from traditional face-to-face knowledge sharing, social media is a good tool because it is convenient, efficient, and widely used. Organizations have recognized that knowledge constitutes a valuable intangible asset for creating and sustaining competitive advantages. However, technology constitutes only one of the many factors that affect the sharing of knowledge in organizations, such as organizational culture, trust, and incentives. The sharing of knowledge constitutes a major challenge in the field of knowledge management because some employees tend to resist sharing their knowledge with the rest of the organization.

In the digital world, websites and mobile applications enable knowledge or talent sharing between individuals and/or within teams. The individuals can easily reach the people who want to learn and share their talent to get rewarded.

== As flow or transfer ==
Although knowledge is commonly treated as an object, Dave Snowden has argued it is more appropriate to teach it as both a flow and a thing. Knowledge as a flow can be related to the concept of tacit knowledge. While the difficulty of sharing knowledge is in transferring knowledge from one entity to another, it may prove profitable for organizations to acknowledge the difficulties of knowledge transfer and adopt new knowledge management strategies accordingly.

== Levels ==
Knowledge can be shared in different ways and levels. The following segmentation sheds light on the essence of sharing.

=== Explicit knowledge ===
Explicit knowledge sharing occurs when explicit knowledge is made available to be shared between entities. Explicit knowledge sharing can happen successfully when the following criteria are met:

- Articulation: the knowledge provider can describe the information.
- Awareness: the recipient must be aware that knowledge is available.
- Access: the knowledge recipient can access the knowledge provider.
- Guidance: the body of knowledge must be defined and differentiated into different topics or domains so as to avoid information overload, and to provide easy access to appropriate material. Knowledge managers are often considered key figures in the creation of an effective knowledge sharing system.
- Completeness: the holistic approach to knowledge sharing in the form of both centrally managed and self-published knowledge.

=== Tacit knowledge ===
Tacit knowledge sharing occurs through different types of socialization. Although tacit knowledge is difficult to identify and codify, relevant factors that influence tacit knowledge sharing include:

- Informal networks such as daily interactions between people within a defined environment (work, school, home, etc.). These networks span hierarchies and functions.
- The provision of space where people can engage in unstructured or unmonitored discussions, thereby fostering informal networks.
- Unstructured, less-structured or experimental work practices that encourage creative problem solving, and the development of social networks.
- An organizational culture which is based on trust. This encourages employees to share their knowledge.
- Employees' strong organizational commitment and loyalty to their employers supports tacit knowledge sharing.

=== Embedded knowledge ===
Embedded knowledge sharing occurs when knowledge is shared through clearly delineated products, processes, routines, etc. This knowledge can be shared in different ways, such as:

- Scenario planning and debriefing: providing a structured space to create possible scenarios, followed by a discussion of what happened, and how it could have been different.
- Management training.
- Knowledge transfer: deliberately integrating systems, processes, routines, etc., to combine and share relevant knowledge.

== Methods ==
There are several methods both formal and informal that have claims to enable knowledge sharing in organisations. These include, but are not limited to:

- Communities of practice: a group of people who share a craft or a profession; usually takes the form of cross organizational or inter-organizational workgroups, in physical, virtual or blended forms
- Communities of interest: Informal and voluntary gathering of individuals discussing on a regular basis, in many cases through defined digital channel
- Workgroups: Task-oriented groups that may include project teams or employees from various departments, working and sharing knowledge together towards a specific goal such as product development or production
- Knowledge cafe: a methodology to conduct knowledge sharing sessions using a combination of a large assembly and of small discussion groups of 3–5 persons, usually around small tables
- Lessons learned techniques: techniques to learn from what has happened before and what could be done better the next time.
- Mentoring: a way to share a wide range of knowledge from technical values to technical and operational skills. Via mentoring programs, it is possible to share tacit norms of behaviour and cultural values.
- Chats: Informal sharing, using instant messaging platforms. The knowledge is accessible mainly in the present or by search.
- Wikis: digital spaces for gathering and sharing knowledge asynchronously on specific topics. Wiki pages link across topics to form an intuitive network of accumulated knowledge, using categories as a means of organizing the information.
- Storytelling: an informal way to share knowledge, where knowledge owner shares real life stories to other.
- Shared Knowledge Bases: Shared organized content, containing information and knowledge. Can be formed as websites, intranets databases, file drives, comprehensive models based on probabilistic-causal relationships. or any other form that enables the access to content by the various individuals.
- Expert Maps: Organized lists or network of experts and corresponding expertise. Enables indirect access to the knowledge (via the expert).

== Connection to adjacent disciplines ==
=== Information technology systems ===
Information technology (IT) systems are common tools that help facilitate knowledge sharing and knowledge management. The main role of IT systems is to help people share knowledge through common platforms and electronic storage to help make access simpler, encouraging economic reuse of knowledge. IT systems can provide codification, personalization, electronic repositories for information and can help people locate each other to communicate directly. With appropriate training and education, IT systems can make it easier for organizations to acquire, store or disseminate knowledge.

=== Economic theory ===
In economic theory, knowledge sharing has been studied in the field of industrial organization and in the field of contract theory. In industrial organization, Bhattacharya, Glazer, and Sappington (1992) have emphasized the importance of knowledge sharing in research joint ventures in a context of imperfect competition. In the theory of incomplete contracts, Rosenkranz and Schmitz (1999, 2003) have used the Grossman-Hart-Moore property rights approach to study how knowledge sharing is affected by the underlying ownership structure.

== Importance to organizations ==
Knowledge is transferred in organizations whether it is a managed process or not since everyday knowledge transfer is a key part of organizational life. However, finding the best expert to share their knowledge in a specific matter could be hard, especially in larger organizations. Therefore, a structured strategy for knowledge transfer is required for the organization to thrive. Larger companies have a higher tendency to invest more on knowledge management processes, although competitive benefits are gained regardless of organization size.

In an organizational context, tacit knowledge refers to a kind of knowledge that human beings develop by the experience they gain over years. At present the employees' experience and knowledge can be seen as the most important and most valuable source that organizations have to protect. Knowledge constitutes a valuable, intangible asset for creating and sustaining competitive advantages within organizations. Several factors affect knowledge sharing in organizations, such as organizational culture, trust, incentives, and technology. In an organization, five distinct conditions of the organizational culture have a positive effect on knowledge-sharing: communication and coordination between groups, trust, top management support, the reward system, and openness. Concerning the communication and coordination between groups condition, the organizations that are centralized with a bureaucratic management style can hinder the creation of new knowledge whereas a flexible decentralized organizational structure encourages knowledge-sharing. Also, internationalization is crucial for compliance or conformity. Dalkir (2005) says that internationalization is believing that the "behavior dictated by the norm truly the right and proper way to behave". If the norm is to communicate and collaborate between teams, it will be much easier for members of the group to internalize these values and act accordingly.

Drivers for knowledge sharing are connected to both human resources and software. Knowledge sharing activities are commonly supported by knowledge management systems, a form of information technology (IT) that facilitates and organizes information within a company or organization. Knowledge sharing in knowledge management systems can be driven by accountability-inducing management practices. The combination of evaluation and reward as an accountability-inducing management practice has been presented as and effective way for enhancing knowledge sharing.

== Challenges ==
Knowledge sharing can sometimes constitute a major challenge in the field of knowledge management. The difficulty of knowledge sharing resides in the transference of knowledge from one entity to another, Some employees and team leaders tend to resist sharing their knowledge for (inter)personal matters, for instance because of the notion that knowledge is one's property; ownership, therefore, becomes very important. Leaders and supervisors tend to hoard information in order to demonstrate power and supremacy over their employees.

In order to counteract this, individuals must be reassured that they will receive some type of incentive for what they create. Supervisors and managers have a key role in this – they need to create a work culture which encourages employees to share their knowledge. However, Dalkir (2005) demonstrated that individuals are most commonly rewarded for what they know, not what they share. Negative consequences, such as isolation and resistance to ideas, occur when knowledge sharing is impeded.

Sometimes the problem is that a part of an employee's knowledge can be subconscious and therefore it may be difficult to share information. To promote knowledge sharing and remove knowledge sharing obstacles, the organizational culture of an entity should encourage discovery and innovation. Members who trust each other are willing to exchange knowledge and at the same time want to embrace knowledge from other members as well. National culture is also one of the common barriers of knowledge sharing because culture has a huge effect on how people tend to share knowledge between each other. In some cultures, people share everything, in other cultures people share when asked, and in some cultures, people do not share even if it would help to achieve common goals.

The political scientist Hélène Hatzfeld has pointed out that people who have knowledge can be reluctant to share that knowledge when they are not confident in their own expertise, so to facilitate knowledge sharing, structures can be designed to elevate everyone to the status of a potential expert and make them more comfortable contributing; one example of such a system, to which Hatzfeld attributes mixed success in this regard, is Wikipedia.

Pinho et al. (2012) have made a comprehensive literature review of knowledge management barriers and facilitators. Barriers are considered to be obstacles that hinder knowledge acquisition, creation, sharing and transfer in and between organizations based on individual, socio-organizational or technological reasons. Respectively facilitators are seen as enabling factors that improve, stimulate or promote the flow of knowledge. According to Maier et al. (2002) understanding of the process supporting knowledge management enables further consideration of the obstacles and facilitating factors.

== See also ==
- Knowledge market
- Knowledge translation
- Learning-by-doing
- Library makerspaces
- Skill building
- Upskilling
- Transfer of learning
