= Jean-Baptiste Côté =

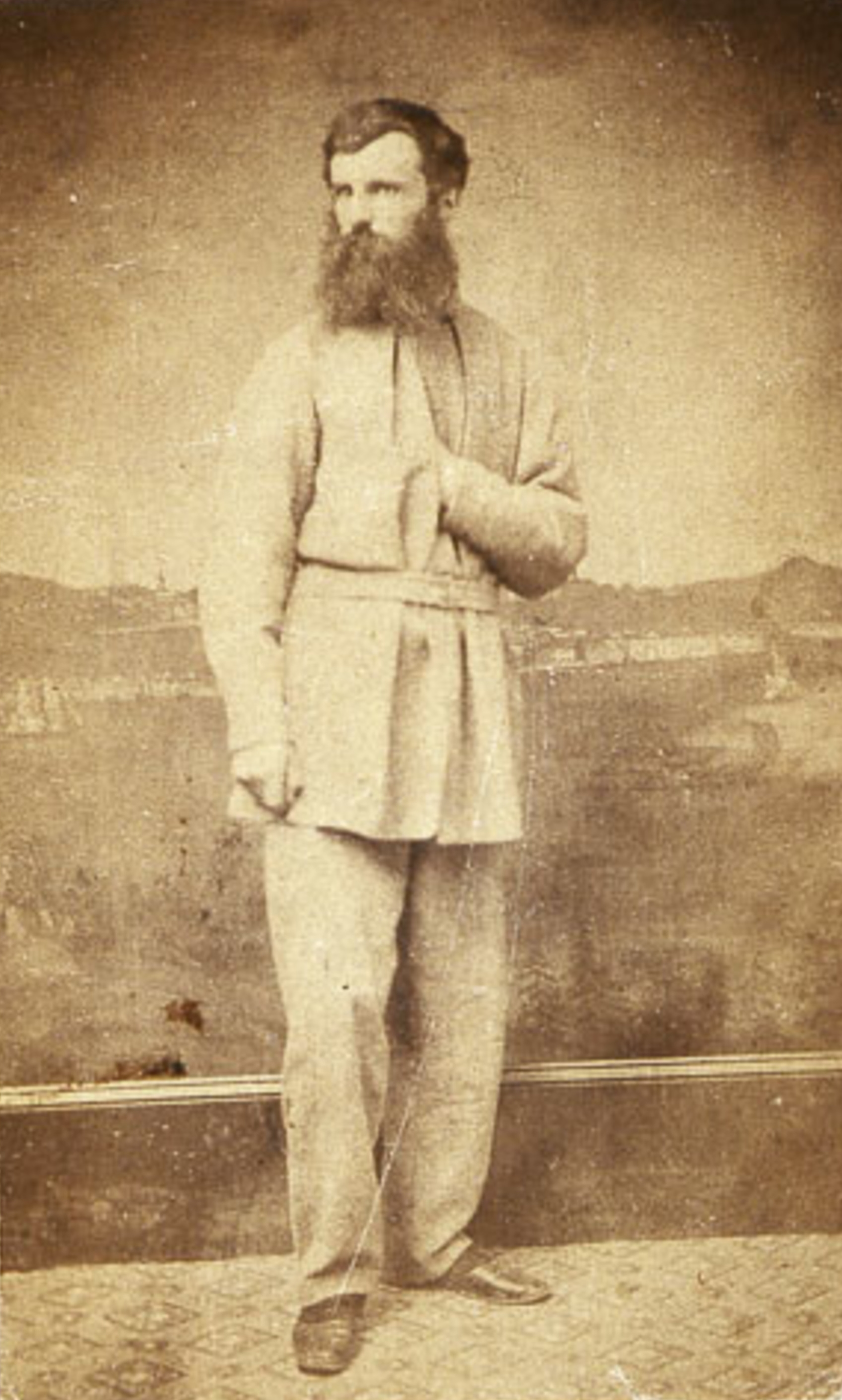
- Jean-Baptiste Côté, circa 1865 (Musée national des beaux-arts du Québec)
- Born: May 30, 1832; Quebec City, Lower Canada
- Died: April 9, 1907 (aged 74); Quebec City, Quebec, Canada

Jean-Baptiste Côté (30 May 1832 – 9 April 1907) was a Canadian architect, wood-carver, glider, wood engraver, caricaturist, publisher, and printer. His reputation rests on his wood engravings, and on his being one of Canada's earliest cartoonists.

== Life and career ==
Jean-Baptiste Côté was born to Jean-Baptiste Côté and Hélène Grenier in the Saint-Roch parish in the Lower Town of Quebec City. The elder Côté worked as a carpenter in the shipbuilding yards near the Rivière Saint-Charles.

Côté became apprenticed as an architect to François-Xavier Berlinguet around 1850. Côté lacked a strong interest in architecture and turned to wood-carving, going into business for himself decorating ships—shipbuilding at the time employed almost half the population of the city.

The Saint-Roch fire of October 1866 destroyed Côté's workshop, and another fire on 24 May 1870 destroyed his home on Rue de la Couronne.

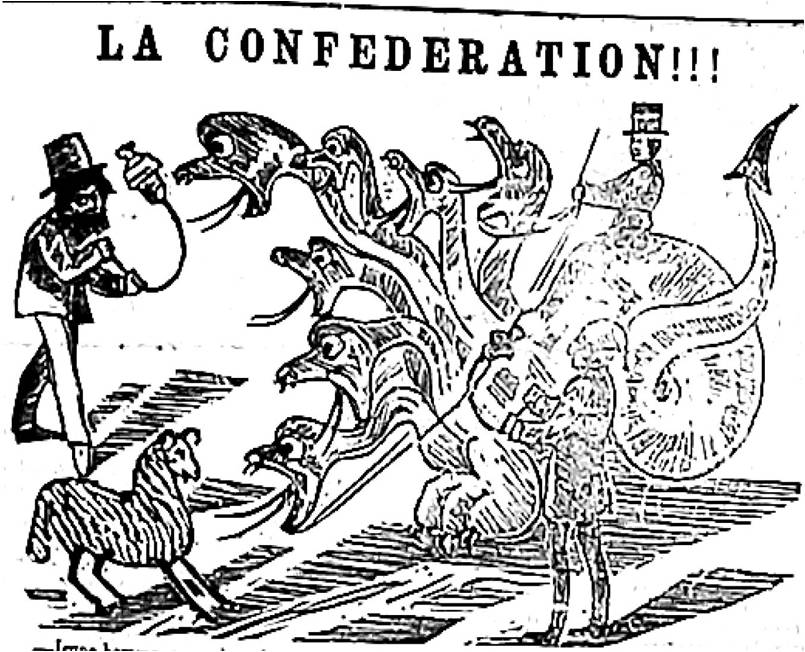
Political cartoon by Côté depicting Canadian Confederation as a nine-headed dragon, La Scie, 2 December 1864

Côté contributed about 60 wood-engraved cartoons to the satirical newspaper La Scie in 1864–65, and thereafter had political caricatures published in a variety of other such periodicals. Targets included Canadian Confederation, politicians such as George-Étienne Cartier and George Brown, and journalists such as François Évanturel and Hector Berthelot. Côté and Adolphe Guérard left La Scie in 1865 to found the printing company A. Guérard et Compagnie and published La Scie illustrée with the intention of bringing a halt to Confederation. Côté contributed hundreds of woodcuts: mainly caricatures, as well as some portraits and rebuses. In May 1866 La Scie illustrée was replaced by the more serious weekly L’Électeur, then the unillustrated L'Écho du peuple (June 1867 – April 1868), and then the humorous Le Charivari canadien (June–November 1868). Several cartoons in Le Charivari canadien were signed "Nemo", which may have been a pseudonym of Côté's; if they were, they likely would have been his last published caricatures.

Steel-hulled ship construction came to take over from those of wood in the 1870s, and Côté turned his skills elsewhere: furniture, signs, cigar store Indians, religious carvings, hearses, tombstones, and others. He began attracting attention for his statuary, and in 1877 won a special prize at the provincial exhibition for his wooden statues. He won a commission to carve two floats for the procession on 24 June at the French Canadian national convention of 1880. The secretary general Honoré-Julien-Jean-Baptiste Chouinard remarked called Côté's floats "by common consent, the most imposing and the most outstanding, in the size of its figures and the elegance of its every detail". The floats established his reputation, and Côté went on to fulfill a number of such commissions, particularly of religious carvings.

Côté contracted a spinal condition in 1903 and had to give up his work. He died in poverty at his home on 9 April 1907 in Quebec City and left everything he owned to his three daughters who lived with him. He was buried at the Saint-Charles cemetery on 11 April and had a large funeral.

== Works ==
Côté worked in a variety of media, including architecture, wood engraving, caricature, publishing, and printing. He is best remembered for his hand-painted wood sculptures, especially ones of animals. Côté received formal training, in contrast to many of his contemporary folk artists in Quebec. Much of his work is unsigned.

== Personal life ==
Côté's first marriage was on 8 September 1856 to Marie Auger, daughter of Marie Roussin and Jacques Auger, a ship's carpenter and foreman. The couple had ten children. On 21 January 1884 Côté remarried to Adélaïde Bédard, with whom he had no children.

== Works cited ==
- Baker, Peter E. (2017). Celebrating Canada: Decorating with History in a Contemporary Home. Dundurn. ISBN 978-1-4597-4033-4.
- Béland, Mario (1994). "Côté, Jean-Baptiste". In Cook, Ramsay (ed.). Dictionary of Canadian Biography. Springer Science & Business Media. ISBN 978-0-8020-3998-9.
