= Elene (disambiguation) =

Elene may refer to:

- Elene, an Old English religious poem about Saint Helena
- Elene (given name), a Georgian feminine given name
- Eleni Mavrou, the mayor of Nicosia, Cyprus.
- Elene (village), a village belonging to the city of Zottegem, in the province of East-Flanders, Belgium
