= Ladies' Turn =

- Directed by: Hélène Harder
- Produced by: Alexis Taillant, Jeanne Thibord.
- Cinematography: Matthieu Cupillard, Hélène Harder
- Edited by: Laurence Manheimer
- Production company: Wendigo Films
- Release date: 2012
- Running time: 65 minutes
- Country: Senegal

Ladies' Turn is a 2012 documentary film directed by Hélène Harder.

== Synopsis ==
Featuring members of the Ladies' Turn association as well as local female football (soccer) players, the film chronicles a battle led by Senegalese girls to break taboos around girls playing football.

== Awards and accolades ==
- Best Feature Film, 2012 London Feminist Film Festival
- Feminist Favourite audience award, 2012 London Feminist Film Festival
