= Hélène Harder =

French-German director

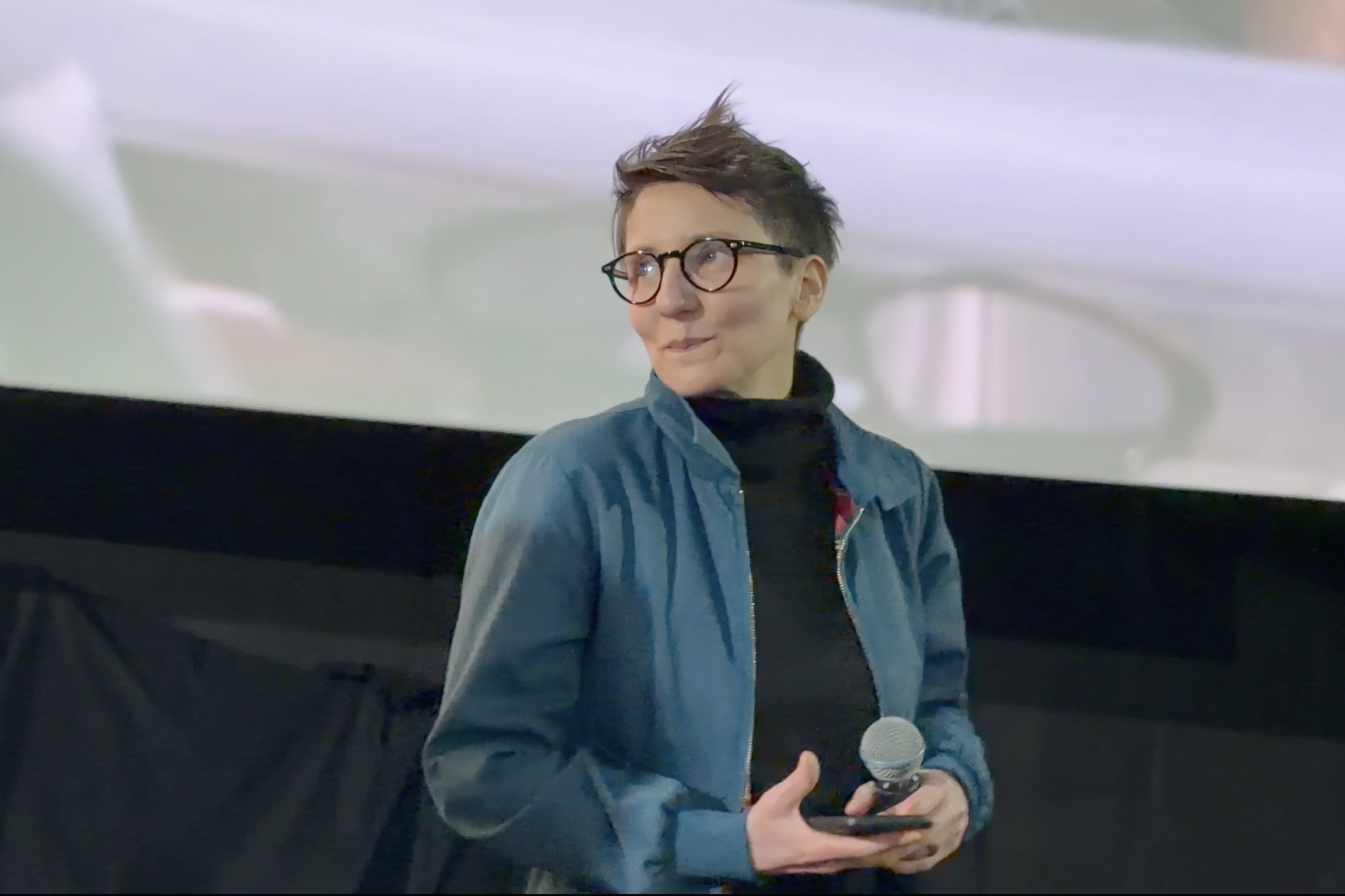
- Born: Hélène Harder
- Education: Ecole Normale Supérieure de Paris
- Occupations: Filmmaker, cinematographer, videographer, writer
- Years active: 2012–present

Hélène Harder is a French-German filmmaker and author. She is known for the documentary films Ladies' Turn and Fatna, a Woman Named Rachid.

== Education ==
Hélène Harder studied philosophy at the Ecole Normale Supérieure de Paris, then turned to filmmaking when a serious accident disrupted her studies.

== Career ==
After training at the University of California, Berkeley, Hélène Harder worked in New York and Paris. In 2012, she made her first feature documentary, Ladies' Turn, about women's football in Senegal. The documentary was selected for festivals in more than 15 countries, won four awards, and was broadcast on TV5Monde, Arte and PBS.

In 2025, Hélène Harder directed and wrote the feature documentary Fatna, a Woman Named Rachid, about Moroccan rights activist Fatna El Bouih. The film had its world premiere at the Marrakech International Film Festival and was selected for Hot Docs 2026 as an International Premiere.

For Fatna, a Woman Named Rachid, she used a non-linear structure that moves between Fatna El Bouih's imprisonment and her life in present-day Casablanca. She also incorporated excerpts from Moroccan films shot in Casablanca during the late 1960s and 1970s. The archival material was used to connect the city shown in El Bouih's memories with contemporary Casablanca.

Hélène Harder and Fatna El Bouih developed the film's voice-over together. According to Harder, they decided against a conventional biographical structure and did not want the film to present El Bouih only through her imprisonment and past suffering.

Hélène Harder also co-created Casamantes with Karima El Kharraze, a transmedia project between Casablanca and Mantes-la-Jolie supported in writing and development by the CNC.

She has also worked as a videographer and photographer, particularly for dance companies, theatre, contemporary art venues and online media.

== Filmography ==
Year	Film	Role	Genre	Ref.
2012	Ladies' Turn	Director, writer, cinematographer	Documentary	
2015	Le vertige de Stendhal	Writer	Documentary	
2025	Fatna, a Woman Named Rachid	Director, writer	Documentary	
