= Helene Fesenmaier =

American artist (1937–2013)

- Born: Helene Marie Fesenmaier; August 31, 1937; New Ulm, Minnesota, United States
- Died: June 21, 2013 (aged 75); London, England
- Education: Smith College; Yale School of Art
- Occupations: Painter; Sculptor
- Spouses: Frank Griffith Dawson (m. 1960, divorced) David Neil Hodgson (m. 1992)
- Children: 1

Helene Marie Fesenmaier (August 31, 1937 – June 21, 2013) was an American painter and sculptor working in acrylic, oil pastels, and wood alongside many other materials. She was encouraged in art by her mother, who had studied at the Art Institute in Chicago. She graduated from Smith College and Yale School of Art. Fesenamier was part of a group who established the New York Studio School of Drawing, Painting, and Sculpture in 1964. She spent time painting in the Netherlands and visited archaeological sites in Greece, Peru and Yucatán before taking up sculpting in Venezuela when she could not obtain suitable life models to paint and draw from this led to her making her own wooden constructions from packing crates using pastels to make drawings on black paper, later to be exhibited alongside each other. In 1970, Fesenmaier moved from Venezuela to London, as she combined painting and sculpting. She exhibited her works in major cities and art museums across the globe, and was posthumously inducted into the ISD 88 Hall of Fame in 2017.

== Early life ==
Fesenmaier, born on August 31, 1937, in New Ulm, Minnesota, was the oldest daughter of German-born physician Otto Bernard Fesenmaier and his Polish wife and interior designer Helene Marie, née Perlowski. She had a younger sister. Fesenmaier attended schools in her local area, graduating from New Ulm High School in 1955. Both her parents held the belief being an artist was special, and encouraged this even making sculpting kits to aid her creativity . Fesenmaier edited the school newspaper and was a member of the Girl's Athletic Association, Debate, Declamation, and Discussion Club, the Student Council, the Madrigals, the school choir, its glee club, and honor roll. After leaving high school, she enrolled at Smith College, Massachusetts, studying printmaking with Leonard Baskin. Fesenmaier was intrigued by Kurt Schwitters' collages and Baskin introduced her to how important print-making was. She graduated with a Bachelor's degree in 1959, and went on to study for a Bachelor of Fine Arts degree in fine art under Josef Albers at Yale School of Art from 1959 to 1961.

== Career ==
After graduating from Yale, she moved to New York City in 1964 to live and work there. Fesenmaier became part of a group who founded New York Studio School of Drawing, Painting, and Sculpture in 1964. Led by Mercedes Matter and George McNeil with support from Mark Rothko, she and the students setup the school on the concept that life drawings should establish the basis of developing artistically. Fesenmaier studied with Dutch abstract expressionist Willem de Kooning also with Philip Guston, John Cage and Morton Feldman ] on leaving the Studio School she spent time painting at The Hague in the Netherlands. She also went to Greece, Peru and Yucatán to visit archaeological sites. While in Peru, Fesenmaier met a founder of the New York Mycological Society while collecting mushrooms at the Machu Picchu ruins, and was invited to its next "mushroom walk" in upstate New York meeting dancer Merce Cunningham and Jasper Johns, leading mushrooms to feature in many of her works.

She left New York to move to Caracas, Venezuela in 1969. The move transpired to be a major change in Fesenmaier's work.

here she was unable to obtain any suitable life models to paint and draw , so she started to build wooden constructions to draw from, which led her to focus more on sculpting than painting. The wood was gradually incorporated into the canvases, resulting in 'combination paintings'. Fesenmaier said the wood " gave off light in the way that flesh did." After a year in Caracas, she moved to London in 1970, continuing to combine painting and sculpting. Initially, Fesenmaier used wood from the cases left over from relocating in her work. Fesenmaier was awarded a commission to put a sculpture called Playback in the lobby of New Ulm Public Library in 1976. Three years later, she was commissioned to create the large sculpture Logbook for the Victoria and Albert Museum's outside forecourt for the exhibition The Birth of a Book; afterward, the sculpture was moved to High Wycombe by the British Timber Research and Development Association to slowly "deliquesce" back to the earth, to stay within her ecological beliefs.

Towards the end of her life, Fesenmaier admitted her work had become autobiographical. In 1989, she created the cedar, sweet cherry and steel sculpture There is a Wall, Scaling Ladder II. Fesenmaier painted in acrylic, oil and pastel vigorously onto a canvas or paper, occasionally going towards the abstract, but almost always featuring an element that could be more or less recognizable. In 2008, she produced a series of saints in coated wire, lead and painted galvanized steel. Four years later, Fesenmaier painted Photo Shoot with acrylic and oil on canvas and created the sculpture Trinity from concrete, lead, steel, terracotta and wood.

Her works were exhibited in Caracas, Düsseldorf, Los Angeles, Madrid, Marshall, Minnesota, Northampton, Massachusetts, Waseca, Minnesota, and Washington, D.C. They have been included in several public collections in the Corcoran Gallery of Art, Washington, D.C., New York's Morgan Library & Museum and Museum of Modern Art, Cambridge, England's Fitzwilliam Museum and Trinity Hall, Arts Council England, and the Gerald Moore Gallery among others. In 1999, a Brown County Historical Society-sponsored exhibition of her works took place in New Ulm.

== Personal life ==
She was a devout Catholic. Fesenmaier was married twice. On June 4, 1960, she married lawyer Frank Griffith Dawson at Roman Catholic Cathedral of the Holy Trinity, New Ulm. The two had no children and the marriage was later dissolved. She married David Neil Hodgson, a painter and a student of hers at the Croydon School of Art, on March 7, 1992, at Chelsea Old Town Hall register office. They had one son. In her final years, Fsesenmaier was diagnosed with cancer, and died on June 21, 2013, from complications of lymphoma, at Queen Elizabeth Hospital, London. On July 15, 2013, a service of remembrance was held for her at Christ Church, Eltham.

== Legacy ==
Bryan Robertson, an art curator, called Fesenmaier “one of the most gifted and authoritative artists working in Europe” over the previous four decades. In May 2017, she was selected by ISD 88 Foundation and its Alumni Committee as one of six individuals for induction to the ISD 88 Hall of Fame. Fesenmaier was formally inducted at a ceremony at New Ulm High School on September 30, 2017.
