= Helene Rothländer =

German politician and educator

Helene Rothländer (23 December 1890 – 1 July 1976) was a German teacher and politician (Catholic Centre Party, CDU). Directly before the cancellation of German democracy she served briefly as a member of the Prussian parliament.

She was released from the schools service in November 1933 because of her "political unreliability". Towards the end of 1944, she spent seven weeks in prison in Koblenz as a victim of "Aktion Gitter". She returned to regional politics after the war ended, and also undertook various senior roles in connection with the education system in the newly created federal state of Rheinland-Pfalz (Rhineland-Palatinate).

== Biography ==
=== Provenance and early years ===
Helene Rothländer was born in Cologne, the eldest of her parents' eleven children. She attended school in Cologne and Koblenz. Between 1904 and 1910 she attended Royal Prussian Teachers' College and then trained and taught in Herdorf (near Siegen) till 1910. Between 1910 and 1933 she taught in a public ("state") school in Koblenz.

=== Politics and Catholicism ===
Rothländer joined the Catholic Centre Party in 1918. She became a member of the Koblenz city council ("Stadtrat") in 1919, serving as a "Stadtverordnete" from 1924, and remaining in office till 1933. It was also in 1924 that she was elected to chair the "Association of Catholic German Women Teachers" ("Verband katholischer deutscher Lehrerinnen") for the Koblenz region. As a result of the regional election in April 1932, she became one of the 67 Centre Party members of the (approximately 430 seat) Prussian Parliament (Landtag).

=== Under National Socialism ===
In January 1933 the National Socialists took power and lost no time in transforming Germany into a one-party dictatorship. On 24 February 1933, Rothländer attracted attention with a speech she delivered in the Koblenz city hall on behalf of the Catholic Centre Party, in connection with the forthcoming parliamentary election. She was uncharacteristically direct in her condemnation of what she termed the "Prussian-Protestant spirit of excess", and found herself in turn strongly criticised by (among others) the influential Protestant minority in Koblenz. On 12 March 1933, she was re-elected to the city council. A few months later, she lost her seat in July 1933 when the Centre Party effectively dissolved itself in the aftermath of the Reichstag vote on the Enabling Act of 1933. On 10 August, Rothländer lost her right to work in the public sector, effective from 30 November 1933. The decision was based on her "political unreliability" ("politischer Unzuverlässigkeit"), and it put an end to her teaching career. In April 1934 it became apparent that her attempt to reverse her dismissal had failed. She was also required to give up her work on "Paulinus", the diocesan newspaper, because she refused to join the government backed Reich Chamber of Literature.

Over the next few years, she involved herself in "Catholic women's work". During 1938/39 she served as director of a convalescence home in Bad Pyrmont. She also worked as an educator for the church. An attempt to kill Hitler in July 1944 failed in its objective but succeeded in seriously unnerving the government. A month later, over 4,000 people were simultaneously arrested overnight in an exercise called Aktion Gitter. In determining whom to arrest, the Gestapo referred to their lists of politically active non-Nazis before the imposition of one-party government in 1933. As a former member of the Prussian parliament, Helene Rothländer was included: she was arrested on the night of 23/24 August and held in "protective custody" in the "Carmelite jail" in Koblenz. While she was there, the prison was badly damaged by an air raid, but Rothländer was among the survivors. She had not been involved in the assassination plot, and had never been a Communist, a Socialist or registered as Jewish, so the authorities found no reason to detain her for longer. After approximately seven weeks, on 4 October 1944, she was released.

=== After the war ===
War ended in May 1945 with Coblence/Koblenz and the surrounding region initially becoming part of the French occupation zone. Rothländer secured a position as rector of the Schenkendorf School in Koblenz. She also resumed her political involvement, and in October 1945 was a co-founder of the Koblenz branch of the "Christlich-Demokratische Partei" (CDP), which had been launched in Cologne in June of that year. Also founded in June 1945, albeit in Berlin, was the CDU (party). In West Berlin and the western occupation zones of Germany, the two soon became one party, the CDU.

She switched jobs in 1946, becoming a senior administrative official ("Regierungsrätin") with the Koblenz city administration ("Oberpräsidium"). Promotion followed in 1947 when she took on equivalent duties covering the (short-lived and subsequently reconfigured) state of Rheinland-Hessen-Nassau. In 1946, she also rejoined the Koblenz city council. Between 1946 and 1947 she was appointed a member of the Advisory State Assembly (Beratende Landesversammlung) for the newly launched federal state of Rhineland-Palatinate. The assembly was mandated with creating a new constitution for the new state. In 1947, the assembly gave way to a directly elected State Parliament ("Landtag"). Rothländer was a CDU member, representing the Koblenz electoral district, till her retirement from the parliament at the time of the 1951 election.

With her uncompromising commitment to Catholicism and her equally forthright "anti-Prussianism", she fought for the retention of separate schools for Catholic and Protestant children. This was a particular issue in the immediate aftermath of the war on account of the twelve million or more German settlers expelled from occupied Eastern Europe - many of them from originally Protestant families, forced to leave their homes by the ethnic cleansing that accompanied the new eastern frontier, which meant that what had been the eastern third of Germany had become part of Poland, Czechoslovakia or the Soviet Union. The territory covered by Rhineland-Palatinate had been overwhelmingly Roman Catholic before the war, but now contained almost as many Protestants as Catholics.

Rothländer also opposed the denazification programme imposed by the French military administration directly after the war for reasons that may have been more practical than ideological. Denazification programmes were implemented in the American, British and Soviet occupation zones, as in the French zone, but after four years of Nazi occupation of France, the French authorities initially took a blanket approach, according to at least one source assuming that "all Germans were to blame" for Nazi atrocities. Mindful that the teaching profession had been strongly infiltrated by committed Nazis, local military administrators began by sacking three-quarters of the school teachers, which created immense practical difficulties for those trying to run the schools. After stepping down from the regional parliament in 1951, Helene Rothländer, now aged 60, accepted a directoral appointment (als "Regierungsdirektorin") with the Rheinland-Palatinate education ministry ("Kultusministerium"), in which, until her retirement in 1955, she assumed overall responsibility for the public schools ("Volksschule").

=== The Geimer affair ===
In May 1949, the British, French, and American zones ("trizone") were merged and relaunched as the US-sponsored German Federal Republic (West Germany). The Soviet occupation zone remained separate, and was itself relaunched as the Soviet-sponsored German Democratic Republic (East Germany) five months later. It was in West Germany that in 1954, Helene Rothländer came to national prominence in connection with the "Geimer Affair". Her loyal commitment to the Catholic Church was again on display.

Robert Geimer was a young teacher who had been conscripted into the German army in 1939, and five years later caught up in the Siege of Budapest. He survived, but in 1945 he was captured by the Soviet army, and had spent the next eight years in a succession of Soviet camps. He had returned in November 1953 and taken a teaching job at a public school in Schifferstadt, a small town the region in which Rothländer was responsible for the schools. It subsequently emerged that in 1944 Robert Geimer had married his childhood sweetheart, Anneliese Weick. Anneliese was, reports implied, the only girl he had ever loved. But she was also a Protestant and, worst of all, the marriage had been solemnised in a Protestant church. This was a breach of Geimer's obligations to the Roman Catholic church: Robert and Anneliese Geimer were excommunicated by their local parish in accordance, it was reported, with a strict interpretation of church law.

Robert Geimer had not been able to complete his teacher training before the war, and on 27 April 1954 he enrolled at the Catholic Pedagogical Academy in Landau in order to complete his training and receive his qualification. Towards the end of his first term at Landau, the head of the academy came to give him some bad news. Under the special circumstances in which he found himself, he would not be able to obtain a teaching position in Rhineland-Palatinate. That was because the unsatisfactory circumstances of his marriage would make him unsuitable for teaching religious studies in Catholic or Interdenominational schools. Schools would be likely to recruit older and more experienced teachers instead. (Note: "Ich muß Sie darauf aufmerksam machen, daß Sie unter Umständen keine Anstellung als Lehrer in Rheinland-Pfalz bekommen können, weil Ihnen die katholische Kirche wegen Ihrer Ehe nicht die Missio Canonica zur Erteilung des Religionsunterrichtes geben wird. Für katholische Konfessionsschulen sind Sie deshalb wenig geeignet, und bei den Simultanschulen werden ältere und erfahrenere Lehrer bevorzugt.") Horrified, Geimer wrote to the woman with overall responsibility for schools in the state of Rhineland-Palatinate. Rothländer's reply, which was delivered not directly but via the head of the Landau academy, was anything but supportive. Director Eckert at the Catholic Pedagogical Academy in Landau had suggested that Geimer might consider a transfer to the Protestant Pedagogical Academy in Kaiserslautern, but in her own letter Rothländer volunteered the opinion that a transfer to the Protestant Pedagogical Academy in Kaiserslautern would not make much sense since (she wrote) "the Protestant church also sets strict standards in these cases". (Note: "...da auch die evangelische Kirche in diesem Punkte heute strenge Maßstäbe anlegt.") The ministry would allow him to sit his final exams "if necessary", but no local government in Rhineland-Palatinate would receive any recommendation to employ him in one of their schools.

Somehow the letter that Helene Rothländer had addressed to Robert Geimer found its way to the desk of Günter Markscheffel, the editor-in-chief of "Die Freiheit", a political magazine produced in Mainz by and for members the centre-left Social Democratic Party. The report that appeared in "Die Freiheit" was unrestrained. Robert Geimer was being invited to leave his home state of Rhineland-Palatinate after serving in the military and undergoing eight years as a prisoner of war in the Soviet camps. Rothländer's letter having been brought to the attention of the press, a media storm followed. Her immediate boss, the state's Minister for Education Albert Finck, attending a conference at Hanover, found himself ambushed by reporters.He attempted rather awkwardly to defend his "Regierungsdirektorin", while insisting that he had not yet seen the offending letter. But in the end, he was driven to defend himself with the explanation that his ministry sent out three or four hundred letters each day, there were bound to be some that were not quite as they should be: such things might happen in "the best of families". (Note: "Das kommt in den besten Familien vor.") Invited at least to distance himself from the sentiments in Rothländer's letter, he refused to do so before having had the chance to discuss the matter with her. But of course, Geimer would be able to teach in Rhineland-Palatinate. "We are not so petty in our interpretation of the constitution. But you must understand that blame cannot attach to a woman who serves her home state with idealism". (Note: "In der Auslegung der Verfassung sind wir keineswegs kleinlich. Aber Sie müssen doch verstehen, daß man der Frau, die aus Idealismus dem Land dient, keinen Vorwurf machen kann."") While the matter rumbled on, Robert Geimer took his letter across the Rhine to Wiesbaden where he was welcomed by the SPD Minister for Education Arno Hennig in the neighbouring state of Hesse, who gave him every encouragement that if he found his career blocked in Rhineland Palatinate, he should send his papers to Hesse where he should expect a sympathetic response. In Koblenz, Albert Finck insisted with increasing vehemence and consistency that Helene Rothländer's letter contained a number of judgments and comments which were both incorrect and far beyond her authority. Available sources are silent on the subsequent teaching career of Robert Geimer, but just one year before her retirement Helene Rothländer had become a national figure.

=== Death ===
Helene Rothländer died in Koblenz on 1 July 1976.

== Awards and honours ==
- 1960 Pro Ecclesia et Pontifice
- Order of Merit of the Federal Republic of Germany
