= Helene Kulsrud =

Computer scientist

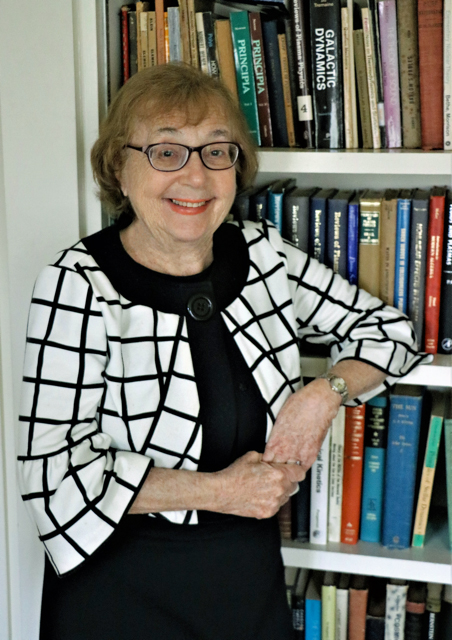
- Born: 1933
- Died: 2025
- Other names: H.E. Kulsrud; Laney Kulsrud

Helene E. (née Steinman) Kulsrud (1933 – March 10, 2025) was a computer scientist known for her work developing graphical languages and compilers for the Cray-1 and other Cray super computers and debugging programs that allowed a user to interactively troubleshoot computer issues.

== Education and career ==
Kulsrud earned a B.A. in mathematics from Smith College in 1953 and has an M.A. in astrophysics from the University of Chicago (1955). She was a member of the honor society Phi Beta Kappa and member of the Association for Computing Machinery.

Kulsrud worked at the Educational Testing Service from 1956 until 1957, serving as the head programmer. She then joined RCA in 1957 where she remained until 1965. From 1965 until 1966 she was a research associate at Yale University. In 1968 when she joined the Communications Research Division (CRD) of the Institute for Defense Analyses in Princeton, New Jersey, and as of 1984 she was the deputy head of the institute.

Kulsrud was a member of the Cray User Group, which shared software, developments, improvements, and suggestions for future hardware for Cray supercomputers; she served as president from 1985 at least to 1986.

Kulsrud also worked on the U.S Department of Energy's Advanced Scientific Computing Advisory Committee from 2000 to 2004.

== Work ==
Kulsrud is known for her work in establishing the groundwork for graphical computer languages. While working at the Educational Testing Service she developed the use of computers to present SAT scores and statistically analyzed the results of the tests. During her time at Yale, she developed a general-purpose graphics language that could be used on multiple graphics devices. While at RCA Laboratories she combined her interest in mathematics and astronomy, writing programs designed to find solutions of differential equations. She also developed compilers, a debugging system for RCA computers that allowed the user to interactively debug code, and a new computer language, IDAL and the compiler needed to run this language on the Cray-1 super computer. She also contributed to research on sonic booms.

== Selected publications ==
- Kulsrud, H. E. (April 1, 1961). "A practical technique for the determination of the optimum relaxation factor of the successive over-relaxation method". Communications of the ACM. 4 (4): 184–187. doi:10.1145/355578.366504. S2CID 18426730.
- Kulsrud, H. E. (April 1, 1968). "Programming Languages: A general purpose graphic language". Communications of the ACM. 11 (4): 247–254. doi:10.1145/362991.363003. S2CID 7548075.
- Kulsrud, H. E. (July 1974). "Some statistics on the reasons for compiler use". Software: Practice and Experience. 4 (3): 241–249. doi:10.1002/spe.4380040307. S2CID 20539349.
- Kulsrud, H. E. (October 20, 1969). "HELPER". Proceedings of the second symposium on Operating systems principles - SOSP '69. New York, NY, USA: Association for Computing Machinery. pp. 105–111. doi:10.1145/961053.961095. ISBN 978-1-4503-7456-9. S2CID 16590861.
- Kulsrud, Helene E. (May 6–8, 1998). Mathematical Methods for Mining in Massive Data Sets. Astrophysics and Algorithms: A DIMACS Workshop on Massive Astronomical Data Sets. Princeton University. Bibcode:1998asal.confE...9K.

== Awards and honors ==
Her work earned her and her team awards including a 1961 RCA Laboratories achievement award for her work on electron guns and a 1966 RCA team achievement for her work on Spectra computers. In 1984 Kulsrud received a YWCA Tribute to Women Award.
