= Helene Muri =

Norwegian climate scientist

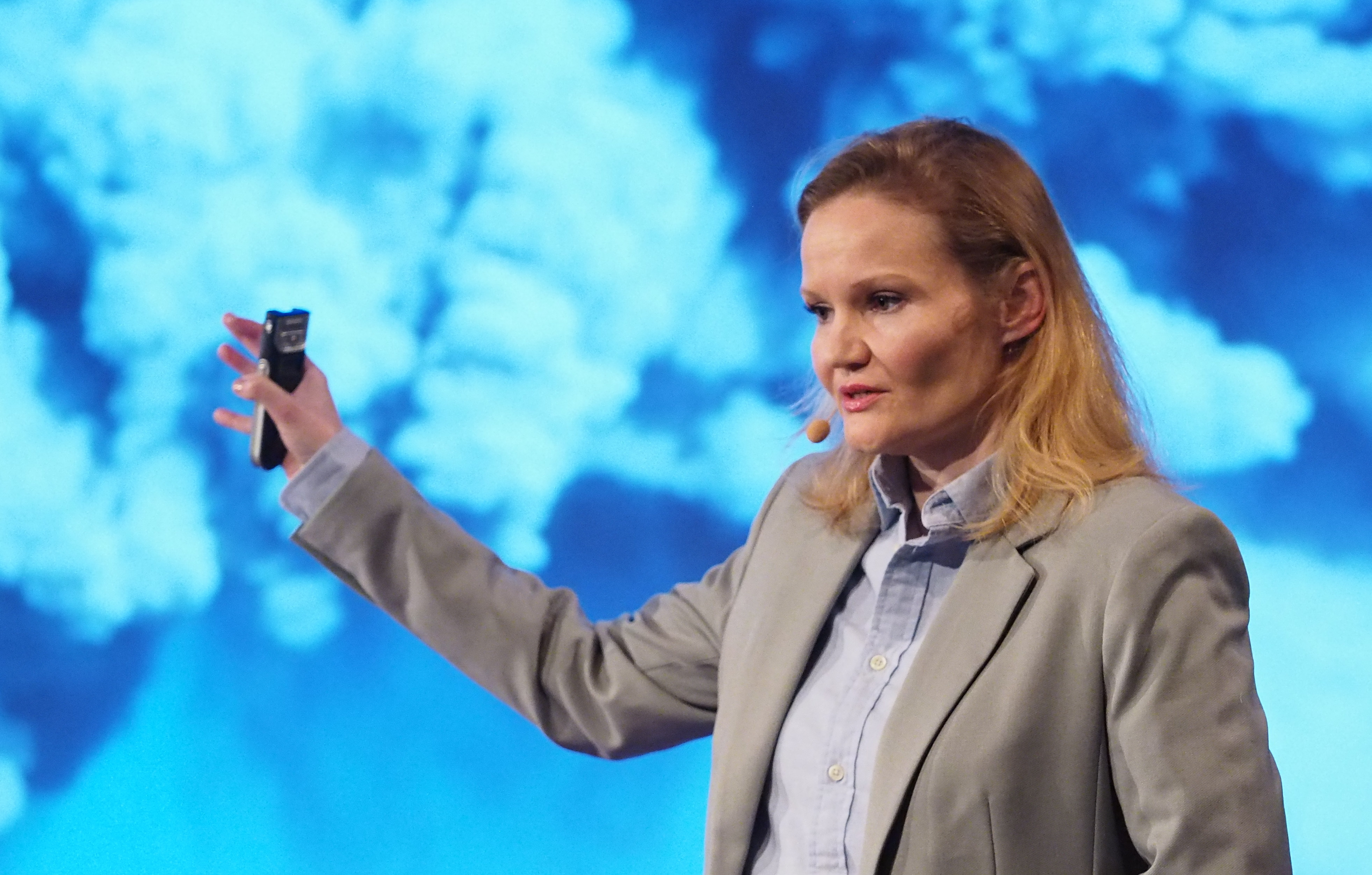
- in 2020
- Born: 1979 (age 46–47)
- Education: Meteorology
- Alma mater: University of Reading; University of Oxford
- Scientific career
- Fields: Climate science
- Workplaces: Université catholique de Louvain; University of Oslo; Norwegian University of Science and Technology
- Thesis: Evaluating forcings in an ensemble of paleo-climate models (2009)

Helene Muri (born 1979) is a Norwegian-British climate scientist working at the climate and environmental research institute NILU, and as an adjunct researcher at the Industrial Ecology Programme (IndEcol) at the Norwegian University of Science and Technology (NTNU). Her research interests include assessing the climate and environmental effects of various options to combat climate change, including mitigation options for the aviation and maritime sector. She is a co-author in Working Groups I and III of the UN Intergovernmental Panel on Climate Change's sixth assessment report and is an adviser to the Standing Committee on Energy and the Environment of the Parliament of Norway. She is a science collaborator on the DEGREES project, aimed at engaging the Global South in solar radiation modification research. She also chaired the European Marine Board Working Group on marine carbon dioxide removal.

== Education and career ==
Muri has said in an interview that already as a 13-year-old she decided to become a meteorologist. She took her education in the United Kingdom: She earned a BSc degree in meteorology from the University of Reading in 2003, and in 2009 she completed her doctorate in oceanic and planetary physics at the University of Oxford with her dissertation Evaluating forcings in an ensemble of paleo-climate models.

After completing her bachelor's degree, she worked for a few years as a meteorologist and researcher before starting her doctoral work. After completing her doctorate, she was a postdoctoral fellow at the Science and Technology Sector, Georges Lemaître Centre for Earth and Climate Research at the Université catholique de Louvain in Belgium. From 2011 to 2017 she was a researcher at the University of Oslo, and since 2017 she has been affiliated with the Department of Energy and Process Engineering (EPT) at NTNU, first as a researcher and since 2019 as a research professor.

Muri has been working on climate and environmental aspects related to the Paris Agreement for many years, including options for reducing emissions in the shipping and aviation sectors, negative emission technologies and solar geoengineering.

She emphasizes the importance of interdisciplinary teamwork in order to combat climate change. In her work for the UN's Climate Panel (IPCC) sixth assessment report, she is part of a working group of around 25 researchers that studies the climate impacts if the global fleet changes its fuel from heavy oil to LNG (liquid natural gas), biofuel or hydrogen.

She believes that the Norwegian higher-education sector could contribute much more in the area of "green thinking" and has advocated that sustainability should be included in all educational study disciplines.

== Publications ==
- "Helene Muri". scholar.google.no.
- List of publications by Helene Muri in BIBSYS (Norway)
- List of publications by Helene Muri in CRIStin (The Norwegian Scientific Index)
