= Helene Benveniste =

Danish academic

Helene Benveniste is professor of anesthesiology at the Yale School of Medicine. Her research group was one of the first to elucidate the glymphatic pathway, and is currently focused on glymphatic involvement in cerebrospinal fluid transport, neurodegenerative disease, and aging.

She received her MD in 1989 and her Ph.D. in 1991, both from the University of Copenhagen.

Benveniste started her career as a faculty member in the Department of Anesthesiology at Stony Brook Medical Center, and set up a preclinical MRI facility at Brookhaven National Laboratory. Her work at Stony Brook, integrating PET technology, measured the bioavailability and pharmacokinetics of psychoactive compounds and anesthetic drugs. Since expanding her research to the glymphatic system, she has received national and international attention for her work.

In November 2016, Benveniste joined the Department of Anesthesiology at Yale University as a faculty member. Her research program is investigating the glymphatic system is affected in cerebral amyloid angiopathy, Alzheimer's Disease, and small vessel disease. For example, her group, in collaboration with Yale's Magnetic Resonance Research Center, found that the glymphatic pathway was suppressed in a mouse model of Alzheimer's Disease (APP/PS1).

In addition, she currently oversees an active clinical research program studying the biology of addiction, in a collaboration with the National Institute on Alcohol Abuse and Alcoholism and the University of Copenhagen, Denmark.
