= Hélène Agofroy =

French artist (born 1953)

- Born: 1953 (age 71–72)
- Occupation: Artist
- Known for: Installation, spatial arrangement, performance
- Notable work: Arrangements, LAH

Hélène Agofroy (born 1953) is an artist who lives and works in Paris, France. Her work combines installation, spatial arrangement and performance. Her works are in the FRAC Provence-Alpes-Côte d’Azur (including the 2000 collection catalog). She is a professor at the École supérieure des beaux-arts de Tours in France.

== Artworks ==
Arrangements was produced in the studio - a fictional space based on the changing arrangements that is created by its occupants. It merges into a single site onto which memories are projected or where personal accounts intermingle.

LAH is a collaboration between three artists, Hélène Agofroy, Lindsay Benedict and Antoine Proux. These are communicated through writing, according to each of their different writing styles and forms of expression. The exchange was printed in red, black and white on a narrow strip of tarpaulin measuring 300 meters by 15 cm. This long print was rolled out along the fence that surrounds Le Cyclop of Jean Tinguely in Milly-la-Forêt, France.

== Bibliography ==
- Domino, Christophe; Le Quartier (Quimper) (1997). Hélène Agofroy: [exposition, Quimper, Le Quartier, printemps 1997. Quimper: Le Quartier. ISBN 2908939150. OCLC 468056566.
- Agofroy, Hélène; Moutashar, Michèle; Musées d'Arles (1989). Hélène Agofroy: Arles, Salles romanes du cloître, juillet-septembre 1989 (in French). Arles: Musée d'Arles. OCLC 77842370.
