= Hélène Ruiz Fabri =

French jurist and Professor of Law

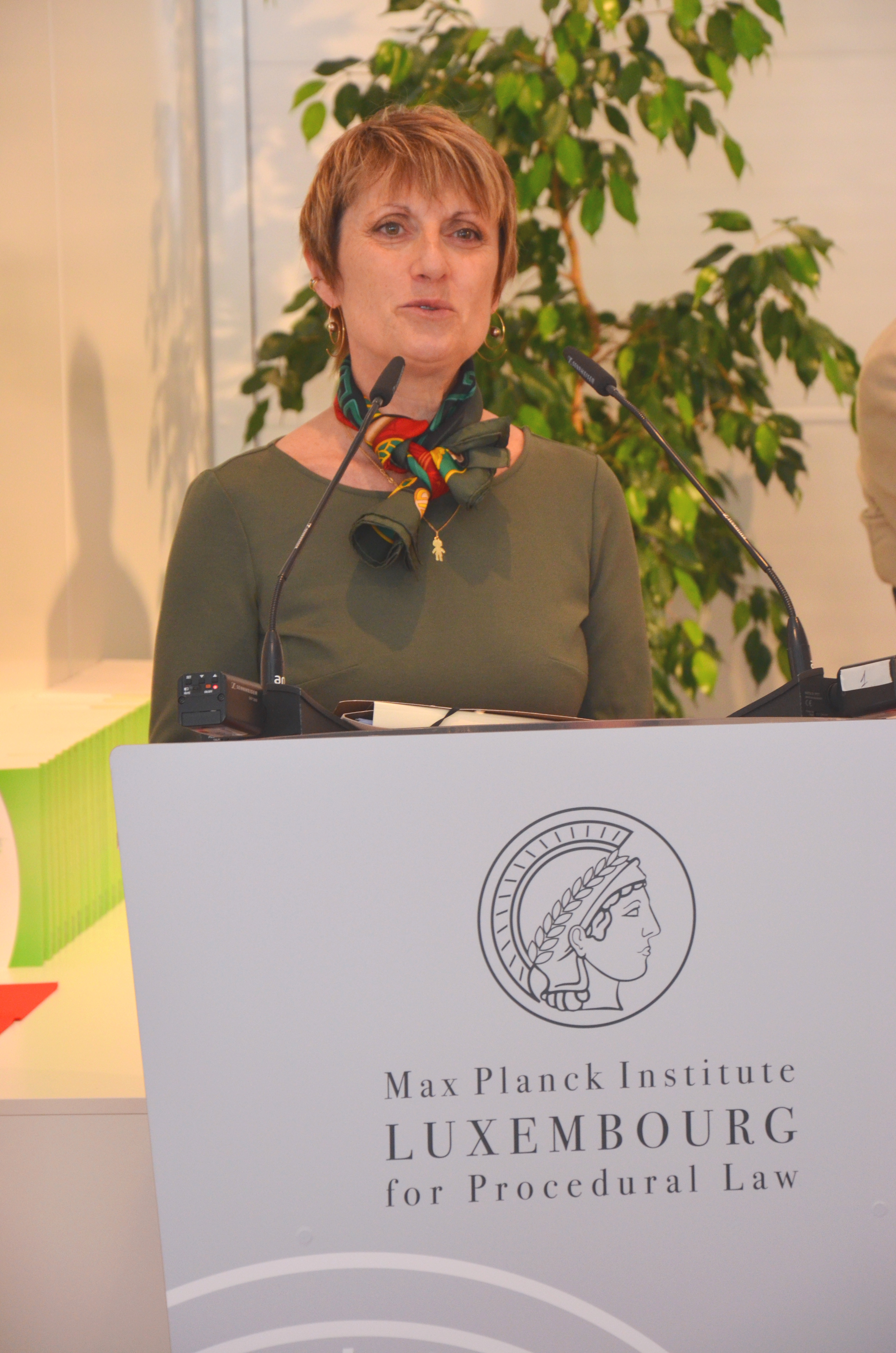
- Occupations: Jurist and Professor of Law
- Awards: Chevalier des Arts et des Lettres; Chevalier de l'Ordre national du Mérite; CNRS Silver Medal; Chevalier de la Légion d'Honneur

Academic background
- Education: University of Bordeaux

Hélène Ruiz Fabri is a French jurist and Professor of Law. She was a Director of the Max Planck Institute Luxembourg for Procedural Law until it got closed.

== Education ==
Ruiz Fabri holds advanced degrees in Public Law (1984) and Political Science (1985), as well as a Doctorate in Law (1989), each from the University of Bordeaux. In 1989, she received her accreditation to supervise research and, upon passing the concours, was awarded Agrégée des Facultés de Droit in 1990.

== Academic career ==
Ruiz Fabri began her academic career at the University of Caen Normandy (1990–3), after which she held professorial positions at the University of Cergy-Pontoise (1993–4) and Paris 13-Villetaneuse (1994–7) respectively. In 1997, she was appointed Professor of Law at the Sorbonne Law School (University Paris 1 Panthéon-Sorbonne) where she would later become the Dean (2010–3). Simultaneously, she held the directorship over the Joint Institute of Comparative Law of Paris (UMR 8103, Paris 1/CNRS) (2003–14) and led the Master 2 Degree Programme in International Economic Law (2007–14).

Professor Ruiz Fabri has taught at the Academy of European Law in Florence, at The Hague Academy of International Law, for the United Nations Programme of Assistance in the Teaching, Study, Dissemination and Wider Appreciation of International Law, and for the UN Audiovisual Library. Her teaching experience is further complemented by regular invitations to conferences around the world — whether it be as a participant, panel chair, or to deliver the keynote address. She has held appointments as visiting professor at Cardozo Law School (New York), Saint-Louis University (Brussels), Hitotsubashi (Tokyo), University Centre of Brasilia (UNICEUB), Helsinki, Oslo, and Barcelona.

In 2014, Ruiz Fabri became a Director of the MPI Luxembourg for Procedural Law, one of several institutes part of the Max Planck Society, to lead the Department of International Law and Dispute Resolution. The government of Luxembourg decided to close the institute, also after mobbing allegations against Ruiz Fabri got public. She has, since 2015, also been an Honorary Professor at the University of Luxembourg while retaining her professorship at Sorbonne Law School (on leave).

== Other professional involvement ==
Ruiz Fabri is member of, and holds functions in, numerous scholarly bodies and associations. She has been a Member of the Scientific Council of the Fondation pour les sciences sociales since 2012, of the Board of Directors of the Société de législation comparée since 2016, of the Research Council of the European University Institute (EUI) since 2018, and an External Member of the Scientific Council of the Department "Droit et transformations sociales" of the University of Bordeaux since 2019. She also co-chairs the International Law Association (ILA) Committee on the Procedure of International Courts and Tribunals, and is a member of the ILA Study Group on the Content and Evolution of the Rules of Interpretation. In addition, Professor Ruiz Fabri is a Member of the Collège de déontologie (Ethics Council) of the French Ministry of Research and Higher Education.

She is the Co-Editor of the book series "Journées du contentieux international" (Pedone) and "Studies of the Max Planck Institute Luxembourg for International, European and Regulatory Procedural Law" (Nomos). Next to that, she is Co-Editor-in-Chief of the Journal of World Investment & Trade (JWIT) and sits on the Advisory Boards of the European Journal of International Law, the Revue Belge de Droit International, the Journal européen des droits de l'homme/European Journal of Human Rights, the Korean Journal of International and Comparative Law, and the European Yearbook of International Economic Law.

Aside her academic career, Ruiz Fabri has been a Consultant for the Council of Europe on the ratification and implementation of the European Convention on Human Rights in various Eastern European countries. She has advised the French Government and the Organisation Internationale de la Francophonie on international legal issues related to the preservation and promotion of cultural diversity. Since 2012, she has been listed by the EU as Expert or Arbitrator for various agreements, including: the Trade and Sustainable Chapter of the EU/Korea Free Trade Agreement; the Cultural Protocol to the EU-Republic of Korea Free Trade Agreement; the EU-Central America Association Agreement; the EU-Colombia/Peru Trade Agreements; the EU-Moldova Association Agreement; and the EU-Georgia Association Agreement. In 2013, she was selected by the WTO Dispute Settlement Body as an Expert in "Trade in Goods and Services" and, in 2018, was appointed as a Panellist for issues arising under Chapter 24 (Trade and environment) of the EU-Canada Comprehensive Economic and Trade Agreement (CETA).

Professor Ruiz Fabri has been serving as President of the Joint Advisory Committee of the Organization of Economic Co-Operation and Development (OECD) since 2009. Moreover, she is a Member of the Appeals Board of the European Centre for Medium-Range Weather Forecasts (ECMWF).

Ruiz Fabri sits in ICSID and UNCITRAL arbitrations. In addition, since 2015, she has been a listed Arbitrator for the Hangzhou International Arbitration Court.

== Research priorities ==
Professor Ruiz Fabri's interests span the breadth of international economic law and international dispute resolution. Favouring a comparative approach, she has focused chiefly on international courts and tribunals— and has published extensively on these topics.

It is her broad expertise in international procedural law that has enabled her to start the Max Planck Encyclopedia of International Procedural Law (EiPro), which aims to cover all essential topics in international dispute resolution. EiPro describes the latest developments in the field and, in doing so, explains international law from a procedural perspective. Her second key project, titled "The Making of International Judicial and Arbitral Decisions", combines the perspectives of law, political sciences, sociology, psychology, and history.

== Honours and prizes ==
- Chevalier des Arts et des Lettres (2006)
- Chevalier de l'Ordre national du Mérite (2012)
- Silver Medal of the French National Centre for Scientific Research (CNRS) (2015)
- Chevalier de la Légion d'Honneur (2015)

== Selected publications ==
- Grewe, C. & Ruiz Fabri, H. (1995). Droits constitutionnels européens. Paris: Presses Universitaires de France (Series "Droit fondamental"), 661 p.
- Ruiz Fabri, H. (1999). "Immatériel, territorialité et Etat", Archives de Philosophie du Droit 43, pp. 187–212.
- Ruiz Fabri, H. (1999). "L'appel dans le règlement des différends de l'OMC, trois ans après, quinze rapports plus tard...", Revue générale de droit international public 103(1), pp. 49–127.
- Ruiz Fabri, H. (2006). "Le Juge de l'OMC : ombres et lumières d'une figure judiciaire singulière", Revue générale de droit international public 110(1), pp. 39–83.
- Ruiz Fabri, H. (2008). "Human Rights and State Sovereignty: Have the Boundaries been Significantly Redrawn?" in: Alston P. & MacDonald, E. (Eds). Human Rights, Intervention, and the Use of Force. Oxford: Oxford University Press, pp. 33–86.
- Hamann A. & Ruiz Fabri, H. (2008). "Transnational networks and constitutionalism", International Journal of Constitutional Law 6(3–4), pp. 481–508. [Open Access]
- Ruiz Fabri, H. (2009). "Games within Fragmentation: The Convention on the Protection and Promotion of the Diversity of Cultural Expressions" in: Joseph, S., Kinley, D. & Waincymer, J. (Eds). The World Trade Organization and Human Rights: Interdisciplinary Perspectives. Cheltenham: Edward Elgar Publishing, pp. 191–220.
- Ruiz Fabri, H. (2010). "Reflections on the Necessity of Regional Approaches to International Law Through the Prism of the European Example: Neither Yes nor No, Neither Black nor White", Asian Journal of International Law 1(1), pp. 83–98. [Open Access]
- Ruiz Fabri, H., Sinclair, G. & Rosen, A. (2014). Revisiting Van Gend en Loos. Paris: Société de Législation Comparée (Series "Unité mixte de recherche de droit comparé de Paris"), 312 p.
- Ruiz Fabri, H. (2016). "The WTO Appellate Body or Judicial Power Unleashed: Sketches from the Procedural Side of the Story", European Journal of International Law 27(4), pp. 1075–1081.
- Guinchard, S., Chainais, C., Delicostopoulos, C., Delicostopoulos, I., Douchy-Oudot, M., Ferrand, F., Lagarde, X., Magnier, V., Ruiz Fabri, H. & Sinopoli L. (2017). Droit processuel: Droits fondamentaux du procès (9th ed.). Paris: Dalloz, 1515 p.
- Howse, R., Ruiz Fabri, H., Ulfstein, G. & Zang M.Q. (Eds) (2018). The Legitimacy of International Trade Courts and Tribunals. Cambridge: Cambridge University Press (Series "Studies on International Courts and Tribunals"), 547 p.
- Ruiz Fabri, H. & Gaillard, E. (Eds) (2018). EU Law and International Investment Arbitration. New York: JurisNet (Series "IAI Series on International Arbitration"), 717 p.
- Erpelding, M., Hess, B. & Ruiz Fabri, H. (2019). Peace Through Law: The Versailles Peace Treaty and Dispute Settlement after WWI. Baden-Baden: Nomos (Series "Studies of the Max Planck Institute for International, European and Regulatory Procedural Law"), 355 p. [Open Access]
- Ruiz Fabri, H. (2019). "Understanding International Economic Law in Unsettling Times: A Feminist Approach", Journal of World Investment and Trade 20(1), pp. 3–14.
- Ruiz Fabri, H. (Ed.) (2019). International Law and Litigation: A Look into Procedure. Baden-Baden: NOMOS (Series "Studies of the Max Planck Institute for International, European and Regulatory Procedural Law), 724 p. [Open Access]
