= Hélène Fleury-Roy =

French composer

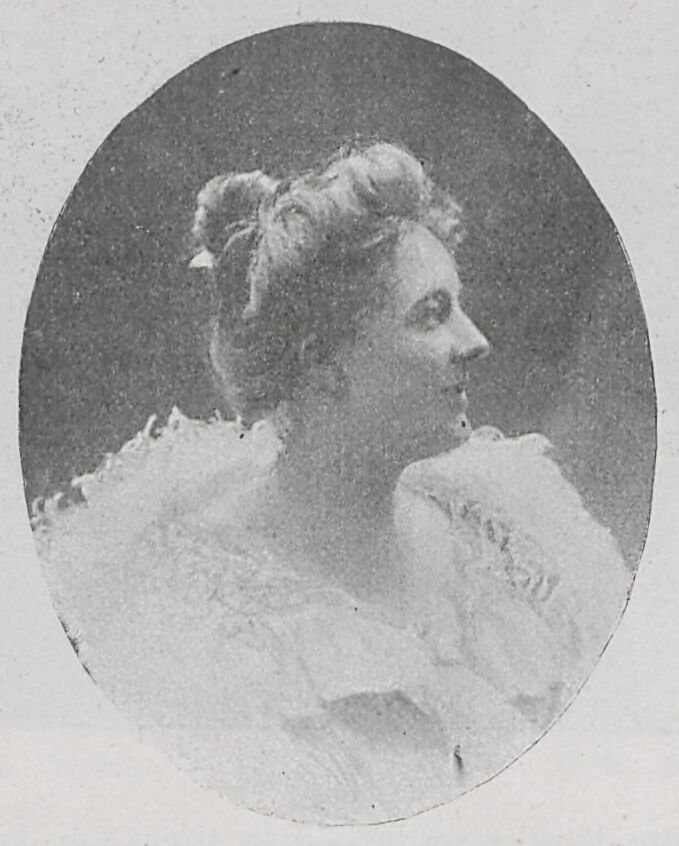
Hélène Fleury circa 1904 (photo by Eugène Pirou).

Hélène-Gabrielle Fleury-Roy (21 June 1876 – 18 April 1957) was a French composer and the first woman to gain a prize at the prestigious Prix de Rome for composition.

== Background ==
Fleury was born in Carlepont, Department Oise, France. She studied with Henri Dallier, Charles-Marie Widor, and André Gedalge at the Paris Conservatory. In the late 1890s, she lived in La Ferte-sous-Jouarre (Seine-et-Marne). She sent compositions to the Journal Musical Santa Cecilia Reims Composition Competition, and won in 1899 with Symphony Allegro for organ.

Fleury-Roy was the first woman admitted in 1903 to the Prix de Rome competition. On her first attempt at the prize, she failed the fugue test, but the next year she tried again and succeeded with the cantata Medora (libretto: Édouard Adenis) for two male and one female voice. She was awarded a third prize in the Grand Prix.

Hélène Fleury-Roy became a piano teacher after marrying her husband Louis Roy, a professor of mechanics at the university of Toulouse, in about 1906, and resided in Paris. In 1928, she became a professor at the Conservatory of Toulouse, teaching harmony, composition and piano. Her notable students at the conservatory included the conductor Louis Auriacombe (the future founder of the Toulouse Chamber Orchestra), composer Charles Chaynes, and violinist Pierre Dukan.

She died in Saint-Gaudens, Haute-Garonne aged 80.

== Selected works ==
Fleury-Roy's works include songs, piano, violin, cello and organ pieces and a piano quartet.

- Arabesque for piano
- Bourrée Gavotte for piano
- Canzonetta for piano
- Djinns et farfadets for piano
- Espérance piano
- Étude for the Left Hand Alone (1899) for piano
- Fleur des champs for piano
- La Nuit (1898) for piano
- Menuet (1898) for piano 4-hands
- Pensée (1897) for piano
- Scherzo for the Left Hand Alone (1898) for piano
- Valse Caprice for piano
- Allegro symphonique (1899) for organ
- Pastorale (1914) for organ
- Medora (1904) cantata; for le Prix de Rome, on a text of Édouard Adenis
- Soir de Bataille, poème symphonique (1934) for voice and orchestra
- Coeur virginal for voice and piano
- Matin for voice and piano
- Mattutina for voice and piano
- Ne pleurez pas! (1897) for voice and piano
- Soir de Bretagne (1904) for voice and piano
- Brise du soir for violin
- Sonate for violin and piano
- Trois pièces faciles (1911) for violin and piano
- Fantaisie, Op. 18 (1906) for viola (or violin) and piano
- Grande Fantaisie de concert (1906) for viola and piano
- Rêverie (1904) for cello
- Quatuor pour piano et cordes (1909) for violin, viola, cello and piano
- Trois esquisses symphoniques (1924)
