= Helene Karastoyanova =

Bulgarian composer (born 1933)

- Елена Карастоянова
- Born: October 1, 1933; Sofia, Bulgaria
- Education: State Academy of Music, Sofia
- Occupation: Composer
- Parent: Assen Karastoyanov (father)
- Writing career
- Notable works: Space Guard; A Call to Arms; Sinfonietta; Suite

Helene Karastoyanova (Bulgarian: Елена Карастоянова; born 1 October 1933 in Sofia) is a Bulgarian composer.

== Life ==
Helene (Elena) Karastoyanova was born in Sofia, Bulgaria, the daughter of composer Assen Karastoyanov. She studied at the State Academy of Music with her father and Alexander Raychev. After completing her studies, she taught music in Sofia at the National Music High School and the Institute for Music and Choreographic Specialists. She served as headmaster of the National Theatre Art High School (State Choreographic School) from 1983-88. Karastoyanov won the March Song Competition prize in 1985, 1987 and 1989.

== Works ==
Karastoyanova composes music mainly for orchestra, chorus and chamber ensemble. Selected works include:

- Space Guard (1985) for male choir and symphony orchestra
- A Call to Arms (1987) for male choir and symphony orchestra
- Suite (1968) for chamber orchestra
- Sinfonietta (1969) for string orchestra
- Sonata for violin and piano (1967)
- Prelude and Joke for flute and piano (1979)
- Allegro for trumpet and piano (1980)
- Four Pieces (1964) for piano
- Children’s Summer, a cycle of five easy pieces (1982) for piano
- Holidays (1992) for piano
- Three songs for voice and piano (1988)
- To Liberty (1974) cantata for mixed choir
- Thirst (1974) ballad for mixed choir
- Days (1974) for mixed choir
- Songs based on traditional lyrics (1977) for mixed choir

She has published professional articles including:

- The Hidden Polyphony in the Work of Johann Sebastian Bach
- The Phrygian Second in the Bulgarian Folksong
