= Helene Sensburg =

German radio propagandist

- Born: 1914 (age 111–112)
- Presenting career
- Style: News, propaganda
- Country: Germany

Helene Sensburg (born 1914), by Canadian and other Allied troops nicknamed Mary of Arnhem was a radio propagandist in the German-occupied Netherlands noteworthy for making Nazi broadcasts primarily aimed at Canadian and American soldiers stalled south of the Rhine in the final year of World War II. Born in Germany, she worked for an oil company in England for ten years and returned when WWII broke out in 1939. Speaking excellent English, she found a job with the Deutscher Rundfunk. In October 1944 she was transferred to the German military propaganda section, which operated a propaganda program identified as "Radio Arnhem," but in fact broadcast from Hilversum, The Netherlands. Sensburg's husband was a German war captain who was captured by Russian troops. Created a radio star by Nazi-German propaganda minister Joseph Goebbels, as a successor to Lilli Marlene, and endowed with a "silvery voice," she provided disinformation (fake news) and tried to lure soldiers away from the fights. As noted in a British newspaper in late 1944: "When the BBC broadcasts its news bulletin the Arnhem station swings into its news in English without advising its listeners that they were getting the Nazi product." Her radio propaganda stand-in was Gerda Markov, who had lived in the United States.

Sensburg's husband remained a prisoner of the Soviet army on 30 May 1945. She was in the custody of Allied forces following the conclusion of the European Theater of World War II. She continued to believe in Nazism.
