= Helene J. Sinnreich =

US historian and academic

Helene Julia Sinnreich (born 1975) is the Director of the Fern and Manfred Program in Judaic Studies at the University of Tennessee. Sinnreich is currently Co-Editor-in-Chief of Holocaust and Genocide Studies and served as editor-in-chief of the Journal of Jewish Identities. She served as a Charles H. Revson Foundation Fellow at the Center for Advanced Holocaust Studies at the United States Holocaust Memorial Museum in 2007. Dr. Sinnreich was a fellow at Yad Vashem in 2009. She is author of The Atrocity of Hunger: Starvation in the Warsaw, Lodz, and Krakow Ghettos.

Sinnreich received her Ph.D. in comparative history from Brandeis University in 2004. Her areas of specialization are Holocaust history, Polish-Jewish history, and Nazi ghettoization policy. Her research focuses on the Łódź Ghetto and Kraków Ghetto. Sinnreich also researches rape and the Holocaust.

== Personal life ==
Sinnreich is the daughter of Karen and Simon Sinnreich of Tampa, FL and was married on October 10, 2010, to Wesley Johnson Jr. Dr. Sinnreich is mother to Nathan Maxwell Johnson born October 11, 2011. Nathan was photographed in a widely distributed photograph with President Barack Obama on July 6, 2012. The photograph has subsequently been made into a mural in Houston. She also has another son and two cats.
