= Hélène Perrin =

French physicist (born 1972)

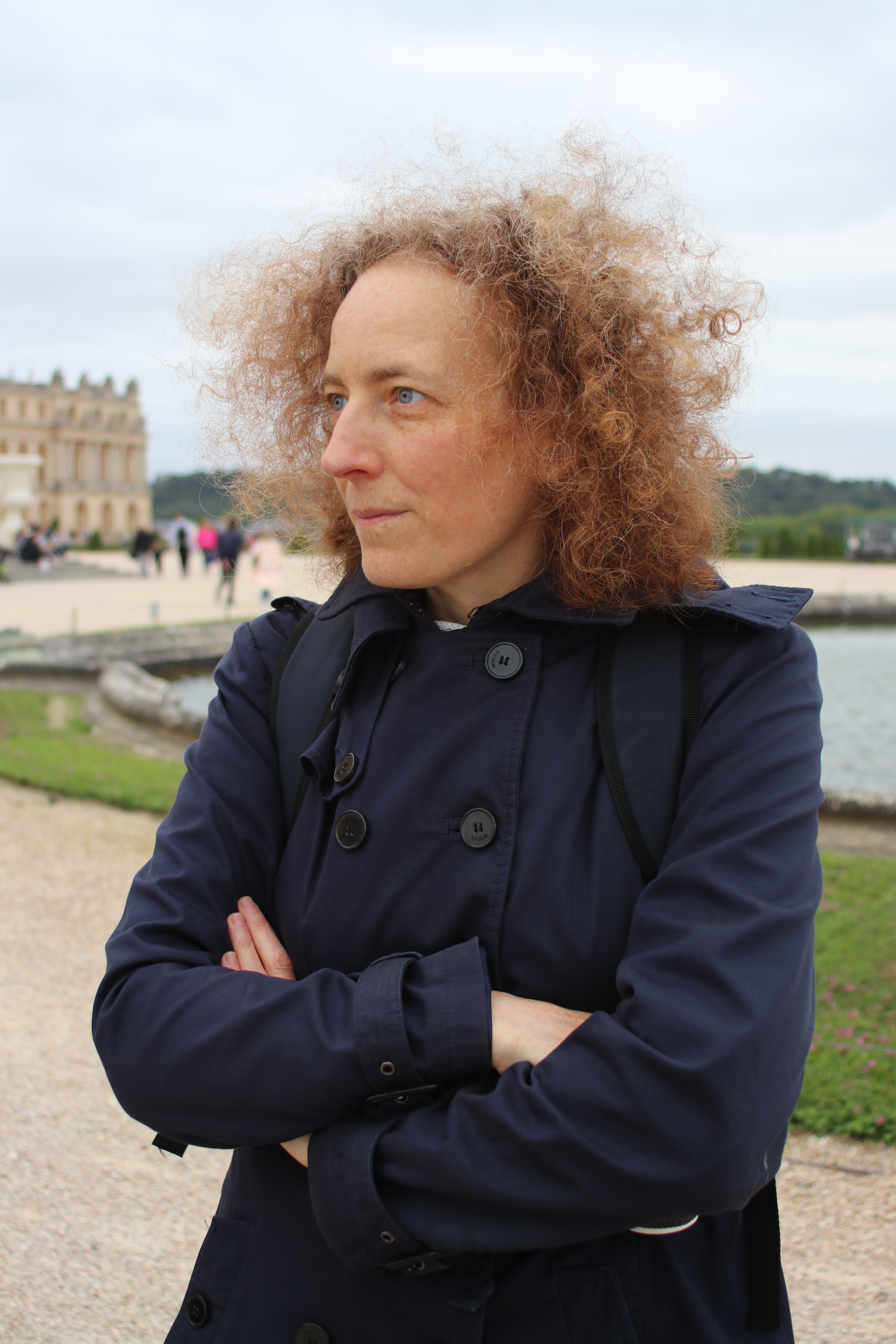
- Perrin in 2020
- Born: 13 June 1972; 54 years ago France
- Education: Ecole Polytechnique
- Scientific career
- Fields: Laser; Bose-Einstein Condensates; Superfluids
- Workplaces: Université Sorbonne Paris Nord; CNRS
- Thesis: Refroidissement d'atomes de césium confinés dans un piège dipolaire très désaccordé (1998)
- Doctoral advisor: Christophe Salomon
- Website: bec.lpl.univ-paris13.fr/BEC/Team_Helene.htm

Hélène Perrin (born 1972) is a French physicist working on quantum gas at Laser Physics Laboratory of Université Sorbonne Paris Nord and CNRS, where she is a research director and leads the Bose-Einstein Condensate group.

She is head of the QuanTiP network, gathering all the actors on quantum technologies in Paris region.

== Education and career ==
Hélène Perrin studied physics and engineering at the École Polytechnique after studying at Lycée Louis-le-Grand, and pursued a master's degree in quantum physics at École Normale Superieure, before pursuing a PhD under the supervision of Christophe Salomon within Claude Cohen-Tannoudji's group on the topic of ultracold atoms, which she completed in 1998. She then joined the French Alternative Energies and Atomic Energy Commission as a postdoctoral fellow before becoming a CNRS staff scientist in 1999.
