= Hélène Fargier =

French computer scientist

Hélène Fargier is a French computer scientist whose research involves decision making under uncertainty, modeled as constraint satisfaction and flexible or fuzzy constraint satisfaction problems, and applied to problems in operations research such as job-shop scheduling. She is a director of research for the French National Centre for Scientific Research (CNRS), affiliated with the Institut de recherche en informatique de Toulouse (IRIT), and a chairholder in the Artificial and Natural Intelligence Toulouse Institute (ANITI).

== Education and career ==
Fargier received both an engineering degree and a diplôme d'études approfondies in control theory from the University of Technology of Compiègne in 1988. After working as a research engineer at Alcatel for three years, she returned to graduate study at Toulouse III - Paul Sabatier University, completing her doctorate there in 1994. Her dissertation, Problèmes de satisfaction de contraintes flexibles : Application à l'ordonnancement de production, was jointly supervised by Didier Dubois and Henri Prade.

She became a researcher for the CNRS in 1996. She obtained a habilitation through Paul Sabatier University in 2006, and was named as a director of research in 2008.

== Recognition ==
Fargier is a Fellow of the European Association for Artificial Intelligence, elected as a fellow in 2014.
