= Hélène Lenoir =

French writer (born 1955)

Hélène Lenoir (born 1955, in Neuilly sur Seine) is a French writer. She has lived in Germany since 1980, where she teaches French.

== Selected works ==
- La Brisure, novellas (Minuit, 1994, "double" no. 23, 2003).
- Bourrasque, novel (Minuit, 1995).
- Elle va partir, novel (Minuit, 1996).
- Son nom d'avant, novel (Minuit, 1998, "double" no. 16, 2001).
- Le Magot de Momm, novel (Minuit, 2001).
- Le Répit, novel (Minuit, 2003).
- L'Entracte, novellas (Minuit, 2005).
- La Folie Silaz, novel (Minuit, 2008).
- Pièce rapportée, novel (Minuit, 2011).
- La Crue de juillet, novel (Minuit, 2013).
- Tilleul (Grasset, 2015).
