= Helene Nayituriki =

Rwandan Catholic nun

Sister Helene Nayituriki (born 1955) is a Rwandan Roman Catholic Bernardine nun and educator who saved the lives of 150 Tutsis during the Rwandan genocide.

== Early life ==
Nayituriki was born into a Christian family, and became interested in becoming a nun at a young age.

Nayituriki attended Lycée Notre Dame de Cîteaux for four years. She joined the congregation of Bernardine Sisters in September 1979.

== Activism ==
In April 1994, Nayituriki worked as a teacher at Lycee Notre Dames de Citeaux, a girls school in Nyarugenge District, Kigali. On April 6, after learning of the assassination of Rwandan President Juvenal Habyarimana, she urged her students "to be united and stay prayerful". On April 7, she collected her students' identity cards so the Tutsi students could not be identified. The students lived in their dormitories, leaving only for lunch, as the school only had enough food to provide one meal each day. In the following days, Nayituriki was pressured by Interahamwe militia to turn over her Tutsi students, but she refused. At the same time, Nayituriki also found shelter for Tutsi neighbors, providing them with school uniforms so they would blend in.

On April 18, school officials attempted to relocated the students; however, Interahamwe intercepted their buses and demanded the Tutsi riders be turned over. Nayituriki refused and bribed the militia to allow them to return to the school. The students, teachers, and neighbors stayed at a nearby secondary school for ten days until RPF Inkotanyi took over the region, putting an end to the anti-Tutsi violence there.

== Later career ==
When school activities resumed following the Rwandan genocide, Nayituriki worked to provide psychological support and raise morale among her colleagues and students. In 1997, she became headmistress of Lycee Notre Dames de Citeaux.

As of 2017, Nayituriki was serving as Head Teacher for Lycee Notre Dames de Citeaux. She had retired by 2022.

== Recognition ==
For her actions, Nayituriki was given the Order of Honour of the Rwanda Defense Forces in 2007. In 2012, ten of Nayituriki's former students gifted her a cow in recognition of her actions.
