= Hélène Papper =

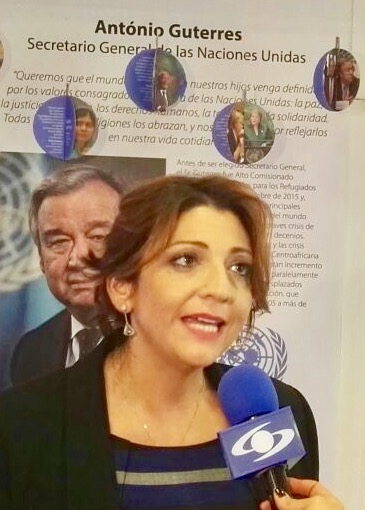
Helene PAPPER - Director, United Nations Information Center for Colombia, Écuador and Venezuela

Hélène Papper is a French international executive leader, former journalist and United Nations official associated with humanitarian affairs, sustainable development, peacebuilding and public diplomacy. Her work has focused on the humanitarian-development nexus, peace and security, gender equality, climate advocacy and engagement with communities in conflict and post-conflict environments.

In 2016, United Nations Secretary-General Ban Ki-moon appointed her Director of the United Nations Information Centre (UNIC) in Bogotá, serving Colombia, Ecuador and Venezuela.

She later served as Director of Global Communications and Advocacy at the International Fund for Agricultural Development (IFAD).

Throughout her career, Papper has worked on initiatives related to access to information and outreach to remote and underserved populations through media, community engagement and public-information programmes across Africa, Latin America and the Middle East.

== Early life and education ==
Papper earned dual bachelor’s degrees in broadcast journalism and political science from Syracuse University in the United States between 1995 and 1998."Helene Papper '98 BA (PSc) is now director of the United Nations Information Center in Bogota". Maxwell School of Citizenship and Public Affairs, Syracuse University. 2016-05-31.

She later studied literature and postcolonial civilization at Sorbonne Nouvelle University in Paris, where she received a postgraduate degree in postcolonial literature and civilization."Le Secrétaire général nomme Mme Hélène Papper, de la France, Directrice du Centre d'information des Nations Unies à Bogota". United Nations. 2016-03-04.

== United Nations and international career ==
=== Peacekeeping and humanitarian work ===
Papper joined the United Nations in the field of peacekeeping communications and public information, later working on humanitarian affairs, public diplomacy and strategic engagement in fragile environments.

She worked with the United Nations Stabilization Mission in Haiti (MINUSTAH) as Chief of Radio and Public Information Officer.

From 2009 to 2012, Papper served with the United Nations Mission in Sudan (UNMIS) and later the United Nations Mission in South Sudan (UNMISS), where she worked on United Nations radio operations in South Sudan.

She contributed to the expansion of Radio Miraya across South Sudan prior to the referendum on independence.

United Nations mission reporting described Miraya as one of the principal public-information broadcasters in Southern Sudan at the time, with programming related to civic education, elections and outreach to remote communities during the peace process.

Between United Nations assignments, Papper served as Senior Communications and Public Diplomacy Expert at the African Development Bank in Tunis, Tunisia, where she worked on strategic communications, public diplomacy and multimedia outreach initiatives across African regional offices.

Papper later served with the United Nations Multidimensional Integrated Stabilization Mission in Mali (MINUSMA), where she helped establish Radio Mikado FM, a United Nations-supported radio station created to support dialogue, reconciliation and public access to information during Mali’s political transition.

Mikado FM developed multilingual broadcasting and community-based programming focused on dialogue between communities, civil society organizations and local populations.

=== United Nations Information Centre Bogotá ===
In March 2016, United Nations Secretary-General Ban Ki-moon appointed Papper Director of the United Nations Information Centre in Bogotá, serving Colombia, Ecuador and Venezuela.

During her tenure, she worked on initiatives related to peacebuilding, sustainable development, gender equality and public diplomacy in Latin America.

She supported partnerships related to gender equality, sustainable development and social inclusion across Colombia, Ecuador and Venezuela.

She participated in advocacy initiatives addressing violence against women and gender-based discrimination in partnership with Colombian public institutions, civil society organizations and private-sector groups.

Her work in Latin America included support for dialogue on sustainable development, corporate responsibility and inclusive economic development.

Papper participated in initiatives supporting Indigenous communities and the preservation of Indigenous languages and cultural identity in Latin America.

In opinion pieces and public advocacy initiatives, she emphasized the importance of protecting Indigenous languages as part of cultural heritage and social inclusion.

She participated in United Nations-supported discussions in Colombia following the peace agreement process, including initiatives related to reconciliation and social dialogue.

During the COVID-19 pandemic, Papper oversaw public-information and fact-checking initiatives in Colombia, Ecuador and Venezuela aimed at countering misinformation and disinformation related to COVID-19 and public health."UN combats disinformation during pandemic". United Nations.

=== IFAD ===
Papper later joined the International Fund for Agricultural Development (IFAD) as Director of Global Communications and Advocacy.

At IFAD, she led global advocacy and engagement strategies related to rural development, food security, climate resilience and sustainable agricultural investment.

Her work focused on multilateral engagement around the needs of small-scale farmers, rural populations and Indigenous communities within broader United Nations sustainable development frameworks.

During her tenure at IFAD, Papper contributed to international advocacy efforts related to IFAD’s Thirteenth Replenishment (IFAD13), including engagement with governments, development institutions and global advocacy platforms focused on investment in rural communities, food security and climate resilience.

Her initiatives included collaborations using radio, storytelling and community engagement platforms to gather perspectives from rural populations, women and youth on food systems transformation and climate resilience.

Papper also participated in international advocacy discussions on gender equality, women’s economic empowerment and sustainable investment, including initiatives examining the role of development finance and foreign direct investment in addressing gender-based violence and social inequality.

She also participated in international discussions examining the intersection of climate change, gender equality and development finance, including forums focused on the disproportionate impact of climate change on women and vulnerable communities.

== Journalism career ==
Before joining the United Nations system, Papper worked as an international correspondent, presenter and producer for media organizations including NPR, BBC World Service, Radio France Internationale (RFI), Deutsche Welle, France Télévisions and France 24.

She was part of the launch team of France 24 and reported on humanitarian crises, diplomacy and international affairs across Europe, Africa, the Middle East and the Americas.

As an international affairs correspondent, she worked with NPR-affiliated programming and Common Ground and interviewed political leaders and diplomats on issues related to conflict resolution and international development.

In 2001, she interviewed former United States President Jimmy Carter regarding the work of the Carter Center and Middle East peace efforts.

In 2008, Papper interviewed Ecuadorian President Rafael Correa at the Élysée Palace during her work as an international correspondent for France 24.

== Information integrity and disinformation ==
Papper has worked on issues related to misinformation, disinformation and strategic communications in conflict and humanitarian environments.

Several United Nations-supported radio initiatives associated with missions in Africa, including Radio Miraya and Radio Mikado FM, have been cited in policy discussions concerning social cohesion, community dialogue and the mitigation of disinformation and conflict narratives.

In 2022, Papper participated as a speaker in Whistling at the Fake, a conference supported by NATO’s Public Diplomacy Division focused on misinformation, disinformation and whistleblowing.

== Awards and recognition ==
In 2008, Papper received a Rotary International World Peace Fellowship for research on communication, information and new technologies in conflict and post-conflict societies.

In 2018, she was selected as one of eight members worldwide of the United Nations Senior Women Talent Pipeline for Public Information.

In 2018, Papper received the Antonia Santos Order of Merit, awarded by the Congress of the Republic of Colombia in partnership with the Colombian Press and Media Society and the Femyna Foundation in recognition of contributions to social equality and women’s leadership.

She received additional recognitions in Ecuador and Peru related to advocacy initiatives supporting women’s empowerment and gender equality.

== Publications and public speaking ==
Papper has contributed to publications and international discussions on peacebuilding, humanitarian diplomacy, public diplomacy and media development in fragile states.

She co-authored work on United Nations peacekeeping radio and strategic communications in conflict environments.

She has spoken at international forums on humanitarian leadership, peacebuilding, women’s leadership, disinformation and rural inclusion.>
