= Elene (given name) =

- Gender: Female

Origin
- Origin: Greek

Other names
- Related names: Helen, Helena, Helene, Elena, Ellen, Eleni

Elene is a feminine given name derived from the Greek name Helene.

== People ==
- Elene Akhvlediani (1898–1975), Georgian painter
- Elene Arandia (born 1989), Spanish musician
- Elene Dariani (1897–1979), Georgian poet
- Elene Gedevanishvili (born 1990), Georgian figure skater
- Elene of Georgia (1753–1786), princess of Kingdom of Kartli-Kakheti
- Elene Gok'ieli (1918–1992), Georgian athlete
- Elene of Kartli (1591–?), princess of Kingdom of Kartli
- Elene Kebadze (born 1994), Georgian sambo practitioner and judoka
- Elene Khoshtaria (born 1979), Georgian politician
- Elene Lete (born 2002), Spanish footballer
- Elene Lizarralde (born 1961), Basque journalist
- Elene Naveriani (born 1985), Georgian filmmaker
- Elene Tevdoradze (born 1938), Georgian politician
- Elene Usdin (born 1971), French photographer
- Elene Viles (born 2001), Spanish footballer
- Elene Virsaladze (1911–1977), Georgian folklore scholar
