= Helene Dillard =

Plant pathologist

- Scientific career
- Thesis: Population dynamics of Sclerotinia minor and disease incidence of lettuce drop in naturally infested fields (1984)

Helene Roberts Dillard is an American plant pathologist, and academic. She is a fellow of the American Association for the Advancement of Science.

== Education and career ==
Dillard is originally from California, and graduated from University of California, Berkeley with her bachelor's degree in 1977, and then moved to the University of California, Davis where she earned her master's degree (1979) and Ph.D. (1984). From 1984 to 2014, she was a professor of plant pathology, at Cornell University, where she was promoted to professor in 1998. In 2013, she moved from Cornell to the University of California, Davis where she was named the dean of the College of Agricultural and Environmental Sciences. As of November 2023, Dillard has announced her retirement from her position as dean of UC Davis's College of Agricultural and Environmental Sciences in 2024.

== Research ==
Dillard's research centers on agriculture and diseases that impact plants.

== Awards and honors ==
Dillard is a fellow of American Phytopathological Society, and was elected a fellow of the American Association for the Advancement of Science in 2021.
