= Helene Postranecky =

Austrian politician (1903–1995)

Helene "Hella" Postranecky (12 March 1903 – 5 January 1995) was an Austrian politician. (SDAP, KPÖ). She served as an undersecretary of state under Karl Renner between April and December 1945. That made her the first woman to serve as a member of a government in Austria. From that point until March 1966 she was also notable as the only woman to have been a member of an Austrian government.

== Life ==
Postranecky was born into a working-class family in Vienna where she attended junior and middle school before entering domestic service as a housemaid. In 1919, aged 16, she moved on to become a support worker ("Hilfsarbeiterin"). That same year, despite her youth, she joined the Social Democratic Workers' Party (SDAP), the precursor of Austria's modern Social Democratic Party ("Sozialdemokratische Partei Österreichs" / SPÖ). She participated actively in the party's women's movement, becoming "Women's Secretary" ("Frauensekretärin") of the regional party branch for Lower Austria in 1927. In October 1933 she was elected to membership of the national Party Executive.

Political wrangling earlier in 1933 had given Chancellor Dollfuss the opportunity to impose a form of post-democratic one-party government in Austria. There was a brief but savagely crushed civil uprising in February 1934 which had the effect of confirming the exclusion of the SDAP from national politics in Austria's new "Austrofascist Ständestaat". During 1934 Helen Postranecky was briefly arrested. The political activism in which, between 1934 and 1938, she continued to engage was now deemed illegal, and during this four-year period she was re-arrested several times, spending a total of eight months in prison. The political context then changed abruptly in March 1938 with the annexation of Austria into an enlarged Nazi German state. Postranecky now joined the illegal Communist Party. There was a widespread belief among Austrian Social Democrats that the Communist Party had foreseen and prepared for the Nazi take-over since the 1920s, and was therefore much better prepared to convert itself into a national underground anti-Nazi resistance movement than the SDAP. Postranecky was one of many making the political switch to the Communists in 1938. During the period between 1938 and 1945 she played a leadership role in "anti-fascist resistance".

The provisional national government took office on 27 April 1945. Under the leadership of the venerable Social Democratic, Karl Renner, it was a three party coalition of the SPÖ, the Communists and the newly formed catholic-centrist People's Party (ÖVP). This government was backed by the military authorities in the Soviet occupation zone from the beginning, and by the end of 1945 it had also been recognised by the western allies who were occupying the central and western parts of Austria. Helene Postranecky was nominated as a member of the government, serving as Under-secretary of State for Food Supply ("Unterstaatssekretär für Volksernährung"). She was the first woman to be a member of an Austrian government. It would be another 21 years before Grete Rehor became the second woman to serve as a member of an Austrian government (and the first woman to become a full departmental minister in Austria).

In August 1947 Helene Postranecky finally married her longstanding partner, Karl Altmann (1904-1960), like her a Communist politician and a member of the Renner government.

Between September 1945 and November 1948 Postranecky served as one of the deputy chairs of the Communist Party. She remained a member of the Party Central Committee till 1969. Until 1954 she was a member of the party's political office and thereby part of the inner leadership team. In April 1946 she was elected chair of the party's national women's committee. Between 1948 and 1952 she became involved in the secretariat of the "League of Democratic Women" ("Bund demokratischer Frauen" / BDFÖ), a women's organisation founded by communist women, which saw itself as non-party entity, but in practice was always dominated by communists. The chair of the BDFÖ at this time was the architect Margarete Schütte-Lihotzky who had, like Postranecky, played an active role in the anti-fascist resistance movement during the Nazi years. Important priorities for the BDFÖ were peace and global disarmament, along with improvements in rights for women.

Until 1957 Helene Altmann-Postranecky worked as a full-time official with the Lower Austria regional party leadership. After that she continued to work on a voluntary basis in the trades union department. In 1968 or 1970 she resigned her party membership, however, unable to be reconciled to the crushing of the Prague Spring in neighbouring Czechoslovakia by a Warsaw pact military invasion.

She died in Vienna a couple of months short of her 92nd birthday in 1995.
