= Helene Schlanzowsky-Grekowska =

Polish-Austrian ballet dancer

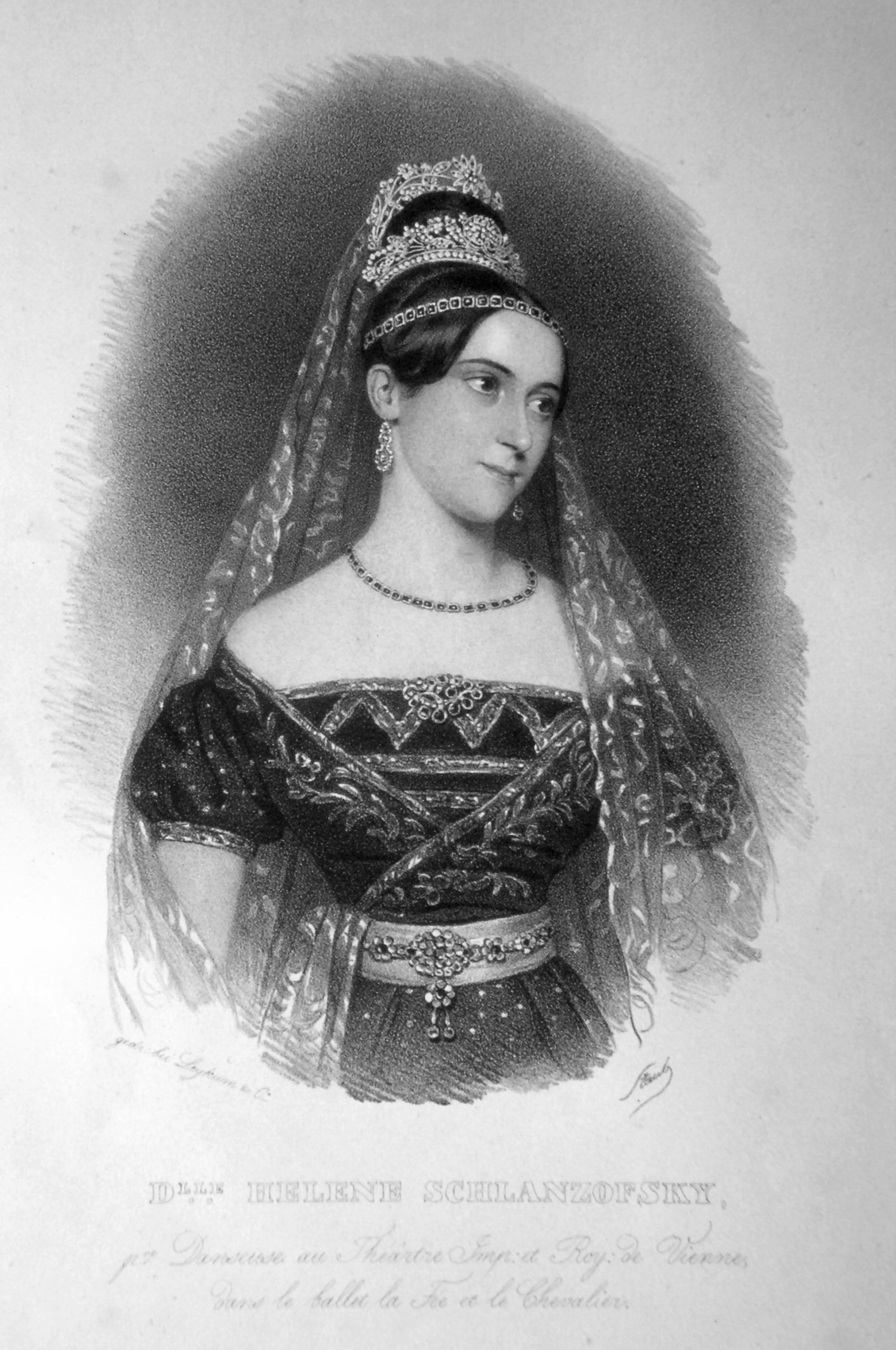

Helene Schlanzowsky-Grekowska (1813 – 1897), was a Polish-Austrian ballet dancer.

She was engaged in the ballet at the Theater am Kärntnertor between 1831 and 1836. She was the first Polish ballerina to have a famed international career.

== Sources ==
- Źródło: Słownik Biograficzny Teatru Polskiego 1765-1965, PWN Warszawa 1973
