= Helene Koppejan =

Dutch astrologer and entrepreneur

Helene W. Koppejan (née van Woelderen; 20 August 1927, Vlissingen - 27 February 1998, Glastonbury) was a Dutch astrologer and entrepreneur.

She published Strange parallel: Zebulun--The Netherlands, a tribe of Israel, a book expounding the theory that the Dutch were one of the "Ten Lost Tribes" (Artisan Sales, 1994). With her husband Willem Koppejan (1913-1979) she published a book on astrology, The Zodiac Image Handbook: The Mutable Signs - Virgo, Sagittarius, Pisces, Gemini (Element Books, 1993).

She and her husband purchased a number of buildings in Glastonbury in which they set up what came to be called the "Glastonbury Experience", a complex of alternative shops and studios. She was co-founder of the Glastonbury Trust, an organization which promoted ecological awareness and sustainable development, and which took over the Experience after it ran into financial difficulty following the death of Willem Koppejan.
