= Helene Steed =

Irish Anglican priest: (born 1970)

Helene Steed is an Irish Anglican priest: she was Archdeacon of Clogher from 2014 to 2016.

Steed was born in Sweden in 1970; educated at Uppsala University; and ordained in 1996. After a curacy at Stora Mellby she was Team Vicar of Essunga. Moving to Ireland, she was Dean's Vicar at Cork Cathedral from 2004 to 2008. After that she was the incumbent at Clones, County Monaghan until her appointment as Archdeacon. Since 2016 she has been at St Mark's Church, Dundela.
