= Helene Khatskels =

Yiddish children's educator and writer

- העלענע כאצקעלס
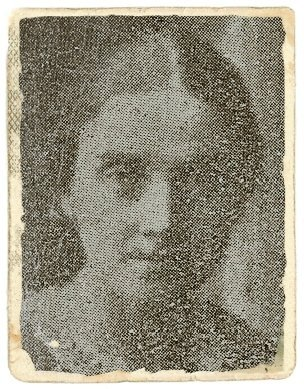
- c. 1920s
- Born: 25 July 1882; Kovno, Russian Empire
- Died: 26 January 1973 (aged 90); Kovno (Kaunas), Soviet Union
- Known for: Yiddish educator, writer
- Awards: Order of the Red Banner of Labour

Helene Khatskels (Yiddish: העלענע כאצקעלס, 25 July 1882 – 26 January 1973) was a children's educator, translator and writer in the Russian Empire, Lithuania and the Soviet Union.

== Biography ==
The daughter of a baker, Khatskels was active as a Bundist early in her life and a supporter of the 1905 Revolution, she subsequently turned to children's education. As part of the Kultur-lige, which promoted Jewish autonomy, Khatskels produced an extensive range of works in Yiddish, including a travelogue on Palestine, “The Earth and the Universe,” published in Berlin in 1924, and translations of the work of Swedish geographer Sven Hadin. With the suppression of the Kultur-Lige and other institutions of Jewish autonomy by Lithuanian authorities in the 1920s her work turned to teaching. Forced to flee following the German occupation of Lithuania, she returned to her birthplace after World War Two. She set up a Yiddish school for orphans, but this was closed in 1950 as part of the wider anti-cosmopolitan campaign at the end of Stalin's rule. In 1955 she was awarded the Order of the Red Banner of Labour and finished her career teaching Russian literature at secondary school level, retiring in 1966.

== Works ==
- The sun has not woken yet, the Dutch are still asleep (English translation)
- די נאטור ארום אונז און מיר אליין : א לערנבוך פאר פאלקשולן (Di naṭur arum unz un mir aleyn a lernbukh far folkshuln), 1922, Yiddish Book Center
