= Hélène de Saint Lager =

French artist and sculptor

- Occupation: Artist
- Website: http://www.helenedesaintlager-art.com/

Hélène de Saint Lager (born 22 May 1957) is a French artist and sculptor based in Paris. Hélène de Saint Lager is particularly known for her furniture made of resin.
