= Helene Muller-Landau =

American ecologist

Helene Muller-Landau is a staff scientist at the Smithsonian Institution. Her research focuses on tropical forest diversity and climate interactions with tropical forests.

== Education ==
Helene Muller-Landau received her bachelor's from the Swarthmore College in Mathematics and Statistics. She received both her masters and PhD in Ecology and Evolutionary Biology from Princeton University.

== Awards ==
Muller-Landau received the Packer Fellowship for Science and Engineering in 2007.

== Research ==
In 2010, Muller-Landau published a mathematical model of seed sizes, demonstrating that large seeds are favorable in stressful conditions while small seeds may be advantageous in more favorable conditions.
