= Hélène Hatzfeld =

French political scientist

- Education: Sciences Po
- Scientific career
- Fields: Political science
- Workplaces: Sciences Po; Lyon University of Architecture (Fr); University of Paris 1 Pantheon-Sorbonne; University of Paris II Panthéon-Assas
- Doctoral advisor: Georges Lavau (Fr)

Hélène Hatzfeld is a French political scientist. She has published books on topics including social science methodology, the evolution of social work, innovations in the city of Louviers from the 1960s through the 1980s, and the political history of leftist parties and social movements in the 1970s.

Hatzfeld's research has been cited, or she has been interviewed, in media outlets including France Culture, France Inter, Paris-Normandie (Fr).

== Career ==
Hatzfeld is from Lyon. She attended Sciences Po, where she graduated with a doctorate in political science in 1987. Her thesis was entitled Les relations entre le Parti socialiste, la CFDT et le mouvement social de 1971 à 1981, and was supervised by Georges Lavau (Fr).

Since 1991, Hatzfeld has lectured at Sciences Po. From 1994 to 2007, Hatzfeld was also a professor of the Human and Social Sciences at the Lyon University of Architecture (Fr). She has also held positions at the University of Paris 1 Pantheon-Sorbonne and the University of Paris II Panthéon-Assas.

Hatzfeld has studied the evolution of the function and legitimacy of different types of social work, and in 1998 she published the book Construire de nouvelles légitimités en travail social which studies the role of social workers classified as level 3 social workers. In 2000, Hatzfeld and Jackie Spiegelstein published a book on observational methodology in social sciences, called Méthodologie de l'observation sociale. Hatzfeld was also the editor of a book in 2000, called Banlieues, villes de demain: Vaulx-en-Velin au-delà de l'image, which is a collection of essays by architecture students on ideas for urban architecture.

Hatzfeld has focused much of her research on the political history of the 1970s, especially conceptions of democracy and politics as expressed by leftist parties, political associations, and new social movements. She analysed under-discussed political lessons of social movements in the 1970s in the 2005 book Faire de la politique autrement. Les expériences inachevées des années 1970, and published a 2018 book on innovative developments in Louviers during the period from 1965 to 1983.

== Selected works ==
- Construire de nouvelles légitimités en travail social, Éditions Dunod (Fr) (1998)
- Méthodologie de l'observation sociale, Éditions Dunod, with Jackie Spiegelstein (2000)
- Banlieues, villes de demain: Vaulx-en-Velin au-delà de l'image, Éditions du CERTU (2000)
- Faire de la politique autrement. Les expériences inachevées des années 1970, Presses Universitaires de Rennes (2005)
- Les légitimités ordinaires: au nom de quoi devrions-nous nous taire?, Paris, L'Harmattan (2011)
- La politique à la ville. Inventions citoyennes à Louviers (1965-1983), Presses Universitaires de Rennes (2018)
