= Hélène Grenier =

Canadian librarian (1900–1992)

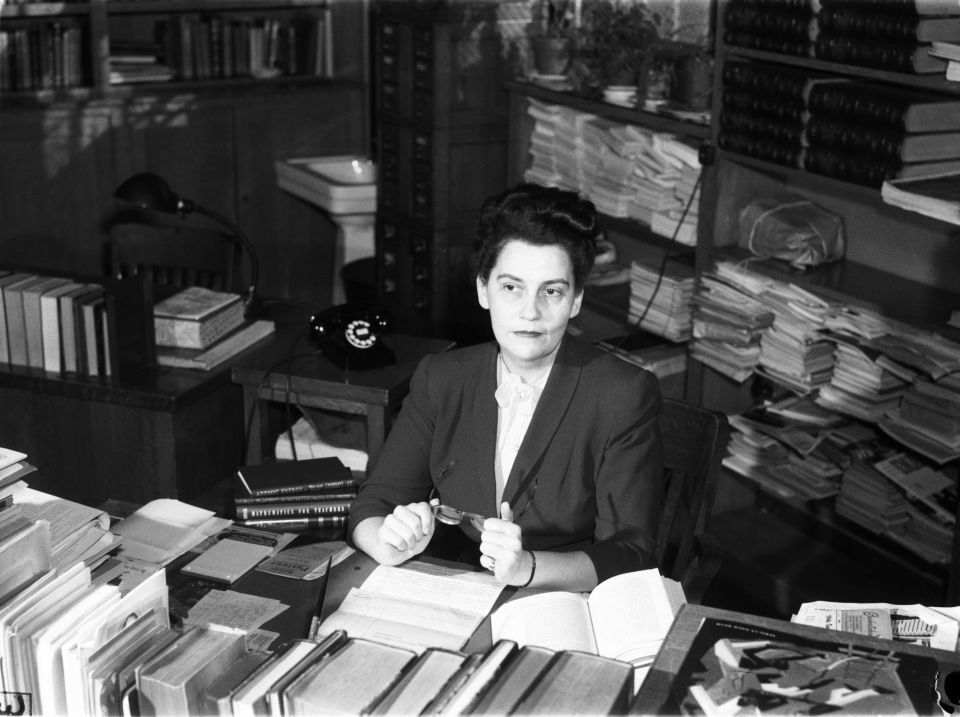
- Hélène in 1946
- Born: 25 July 1900; Quebec, Canada
- Died: 22 March 1992 (aged 91)
- Occupation: Librarian

Hélène Grenier (July 7, 1900 – March 22, 1992) was a Canadian librarian.

== Biography ==
She was director of school libraries for the Catholic School Commission of Montreal from 1933 to 1961. A musician, she published in 1947 a monograph entitled The Symphonic Music of Monteverde to Beethoven. She was the granddaughter of former Quebec premier Félix-Gabriel Marchand.

Grenier's archives are kept in the Montreal archives center of the Bibliothèque et Archives nationales du Québec.

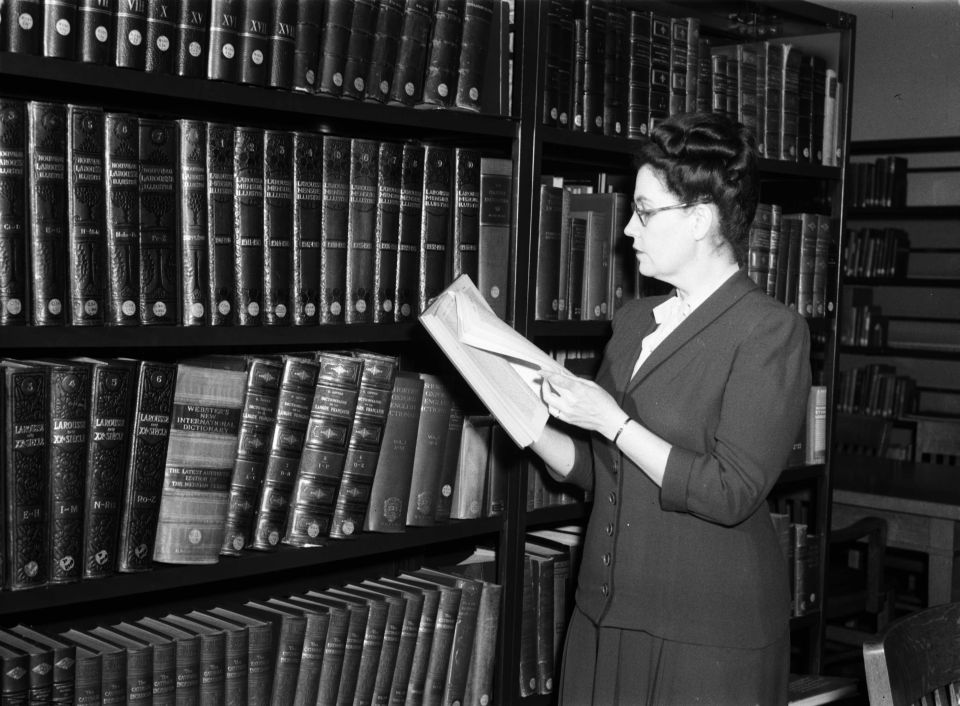
Helene in 1946
