= Hélène Massam =

Canadian statistician

Hélène Menexia Massam (died August 22, 2020) was a statistician known for her research on the Wishart distribution and on graphical models. She was a professor of mathematics and statistics at York University in Canada.

== Education and career ==
Massam earned a bachelor's degree from McGill University in 1971. She stayed on at McGill for graduate studies, earning a master's degree in 1973 and completing her doctorate in 1977. Her dissertation, Mathematical Programming with Cones, concerned numerical analysis and was supervised by Sanjo Zlobec. She joined the York University faculty in 1984, and taught there for 35 years until her death.

== Recognition ==
In 2008, Massam was named a Fellow of the Institute of Mathematical Statistics "for contributions to Wishart distributions and to graphical models".
