= Helene Moglen =

American feminist scholar and author (1936–2018)

- Born: March 22, 1936; Brooklyn, New York City, U.S.
- Died: October 18, 2018 (aged 82); Santa Cruz, California, U.S.
- Education: B.A. Bryn Mawr College; PH.D. Yale University
- Spouse(s): Sig Moglen (died 2001), Sheila Namir
- Children: Eben Moglen; Seth Moglen; Damon Moglen
- Parent(s): Edyth P. Levine Rosenbaum; Edward L. Rosenbaum

Helene Moglen (March 22, 1936 – October 18, 2018) was an American feminist literary scholar and author at University of California, Santa Cruz.

== Early life and career ==
Moglen was born on March 22, 1936 to a working class, Jewish family in Brooklyn, New York, the daughter of Edyth P. (née Levin) and Edward L. Rosenbaum. She has one sister. In 1957, she graduated with a B.A. in literature and philosophy from Bryn Mawr College; and in 1965, she graduated with a Ph.D. in English literature from Yale University. From 1966 to 1971, she taught at New York University and was active in the Civil Rights Movement joining the Congress of Racial Equality and Mississippi Freedom Democratic Party. She then went to teach English literature at Purchase College. At Purchase, she became the president of the faculty and with other feminist teachers including Suzanne Kessler, Evelyn Fox Keller, and Esther Newton developed the first women's studies program. In 1978, she accepted a position as dean of humanities and professor of literature at the University of California, Santa Cruz. From 1978 to 1983, she served as provost of Kresge College; from 1984 to 1989, served as chair of the women's studies program. She founded and directed the Feminist Research Focused Research Activity (1984–1989) and the Institute for Advanced Feminist Research (2003–2006). She established and chaired the university's first sexual harassment committee based on the Women Against Rape model.

== Personal life and death ==
In 1957, she married Sig Moglen (died 2001) whom she had met as a teenager; they had three children, including Eben Moglen. Sheila Namir became her partner in 2001. Later in 2016, they were married. Her niece is Julie Swetnick, who accused U.S. Supreme Court nominee Brett Kavanaugh of committing sexual assault.

Moglen died in Santa Cruz on October 18, 2018, at the age of 82.

== Bibliography ==
- The Trauma of Gender: A Feminist Theory of the English Novel (February 5, 2001)
- The Philosophical Irony of Laurence Sterne (June 1, 1975)
- Charlotte Bronte: The Self Conceived
