= Helen (given name) =

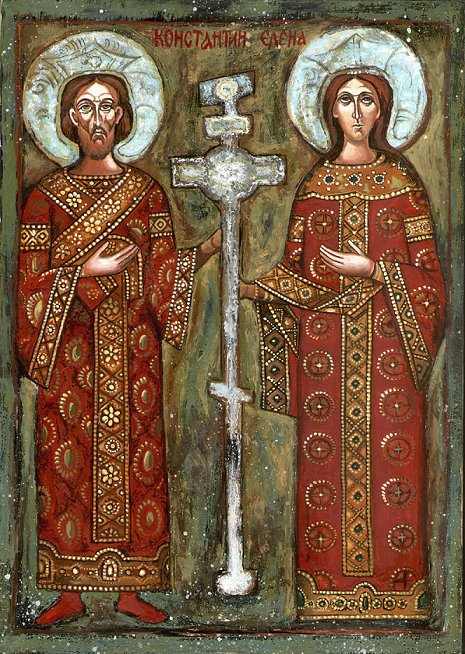
- Eastern Orthodox icon of Saint Constantine the Great and Saint Helena, his mother.
- Pronunciation: /ˈhɛlən/
- Gender: Female
- Name day: 19 May (Certain Lutheran Churches); 21 May (Orthodox, Anglican & Lutheran Churches); 18 August (Roman Catholic Church)

Origin
- Language: Ancient Greek
- Meaning: 'shining', 'warming' (originally the name of a solar deity)
- Region of origin: Ancient Greece

Other names
- Nicknames: Lena, Lenie, Elle, El, Ellie, Hela, Heli
- Related names: Elaina, Ellyn, Eilidh, Elaine, Elayne, Elayna, Elene, Ellen, Elena, Eleni, Elin, Helena, Helene, Helaine, Ilona, Ilana, Yelena
- Popularity: see popular names

Helen is a feminine given name derived from the Ancient Greek name Ἑλένη, Helenē (dialectal variants: Ἑλένα, Helena, Ἐλένα, Elena, Ϝελένα, Welena), which descends from Proto-Hellenic *Ηwelénā, from a pre-Hellenic or late Proto-Indo-European *Swelénā (a solar deity), ultimately derived from the Indo-European root *swel- (to shine, warm).

The name is of uncertain origin. It might be connected to a Greek word meaning "ray of light" or "sunbeam", derived from ἥλιος or hḗlios, the Greek word for "sun". Some sources also connect the name to Hellen, the word meaning Greek.

Helen, worshipped as a goddess in Laconia and Rhodes, is a major character in Greek mythology. The name was widely used by early Christians due to Helena, mother of Constantine I. Helen was very popular in the United States during the first half of the 20th century, when it was one of the top ten names for baby girls, but became less common following World War II.

== People ==
- Helen of Greece and Denmark (1896–1982), Queen Mother of Romania
- Saint Helen of Serbia (died 1314), Serbian queen
- Helen Abbey (1915–2001), American biostatistician
- Helen Aberson-Mayer (1907–1999), American writer
- Helen Acquroff (1831–1887), Scottish pianist, singer, poet and music teacher
- Helen Adam (1909–1993), American poet
- Helen Adams (born 1978), British television personality
- Helen Adams (soprano) (born 1956), Australian soprano
- Helen Adolf (1895–1998), Austrian-American linguist and literature scholar
- Helen Ainsworth (1901–1961), American actress
- Helen Aitchison (1881–1947), British tennis player
- Helen Alderson (footballer) (born 1989), English retired footballer
- Helen Popova Alderson (1924–1972), Soviet and British mathematician and translator
- Helen Alexander (1957–2017), British businesswoman
- Helen Alford (born 1964), English economist and dean of social sciences at the Pontifical University of Saint Thomas Aquinas
- Helen Alfredsson (born 1965), Swedish professional golfer
- Helen Louise Allen (c. 1902–1968), American textile historian
- Helen Allingham (1848–1926), English illustrator and painter
- Helen Altman, American artist
- Helen Amankwah (born 1964), Ghanaian table tennis player
- Helen Amos (born 1948), Australian tennis player
- Helen Andelin (1920–2009), founder of the Fascinating Womanhood Movement
- Helen Andersen (1919–1995), Canadian artist
- Helen Anderson (born 1955), New Zealand scientist and public servant
- Helen Andrews, American political commentator
- Helen Cordelia Angell (1847–1884), English painter
- Helen Angwin, Australian tennis player
- Helen Anker, British actress, singer and dancer
- Helen ApSimon (born 1942), English climatologist and academic
- Helen Arbuthnot (born 1984), British rower
- Helen Archdale (1876–1949), Scottish feminist and journalist
- Helen Aristar-Dry, American linguist
- Helen Armstrong, multiple people
- Helen Arney, British presenter, stand-up comedian and musician
- Helen Arnold (1890–1976), American actress
- Helen Arnold (politician) (1927–2023), American politician
- Helen Arthur (1879–1939), American theatre manager
- Helen Asemota, biochemist and agricultural biotechnologist
- Helen Asher (1927–2001), German-born Australian novelist and short story writer
- Helen Ashton (1891–1958), British writer
- Helen Astin (1932–2015), Greek-American psychologist
- Helen Isobel Aston (1934–2020), Australian botanist
- Helen Atkinson (born 1960), British academic
- Helen Atkinson-Wood (born 1955), English actress
- Helen W. Atwater (1876–1947), American home economist and editor
- Helen Augur (1894–1969), American journalist and historical writer
- Helen Austin, multiple people
- Helen Avery (1938–2016), Australian businesswoman
- Helen Louise Babcock (1867–1955), American educator, elocutionist and dramatic reader
- Helen H. Bacon (1919–2007), American classical philosopher
- Helen Daniels Bader (1927–1989), American philanthropist
- Helen Badgley (1908–1977), American actress
- Helen Bailey (1964–2016), British author
- Helen Baker, multiple people
- Helen Ball, senior British police officer
- Helen Ballard (1908–1995), British horticulturist
- Helen Bamber (1925–2014), British psychotherapist and human rights activist
- Helen Elliott Bandini (1854–1911), American writer
- Helen Banks (1927–2015), American founder of Second Chance for Greyhounds
- Helen Bannerman (1862–1946), Scottish children's writer
- Helen Morton Barker (1834–1910), American social reformer
- Helen Blair Barlett (1901–1969), American geologist and mineralogist
- Helen Barnes (1895–1925), American actress
- Helen Moewaka Barnes, New Zealand academic
- Helen Barnett-Burkart (born 1958), British athlete
- Helen Barolini (1925–2023), American writer
- Helen Barr, English academic
- Helen Hugo Barrett (1921–2019), Anglican missionary nurse
- Helen Barry (1840–1904), English actress
- Helen Valeska Bary (c. 1888–1973), American suffragist
- Helen Bar-Yaacov, Uzbekistani-born American rabbi
- Helen Battle (1903–1994), Canadian marine biologist
- Helen Bauer (born 1991), English comedian
- Helen Baxendale (born 1970), English actress
- Helen Bayes (born 1944), Australian activist
- Helen Baylor (born 1954), American singer
- Helen Beaglehole (born 1946), New Zealand writer and historian
- Helen Purdy Beale (1893–1976), US virologist
- Helen D. Beals (1898–1991), Canadian artist and educator
- Helen Desha Beamer (1882–1952), American singer
- Helen Beardsley (1930–2000), American writer
- Helen Beauclerk (1892–1969), British writer and translator
- Helen Bee, American psychologist and academic
- Helen Beebe (1908–1989), American educationist
- Helen Beebee (born 1968), British philosopher
- Helen Behan, Irish actress
- Helen Belcher (born 1963), British transgender activist and Liberal Democrat politician
- Helen Beling (1914–2001), American sculptor
- Helen Bell, English singer-songwriter, composer, and multi-instrumentalist
- Helen Belyea (1913–1986), Canadian geologist
- Helen Benbridge (1876–1964), American suffragist
- Helen Benedict (born 1952), American novelist and journalist
- Helen Bennett, multiple people
- Helen Benson, New Zealand professor of home science
- Helen Delich Bentley (1923–2016), American politician
- Helen Bentwich (1892–1972), British philanthropist and politician
- Helen Beresford, Baroness Decies (1893–1931), American-born British socialite and philanthropist
- Helen Berg (1932–2010), American statistician and politician
- Helen Corinne Bergen (1868–19??), American author, journalist, critic
- Helen A. Berger, American sociologist
- Helen Berman (born 1936), Dutch painter
- Helen M. Berman, American chemist
- Helen Bernhard (1921–1998), American tennis player
- Helen Ginger Berrigan (1948–2024), American judge
- Helen Berriman (born 1975), British naturist and media personality
- Helen Berry (born 1969), British historian
- Helen Bershad, American abstract expressionist painter
- Helen Bertram (1865–1953), American actress
- Helen Beverley (1916–2011), American actress
- Helen Bevington (1906–2001), American poet
- Helen Bianchin (born 1939), Australian writer
- Helen Bickham (born 1935), Mexican artist
- Helen Biggar (1909–1953), Scottish sculptor, filmmaker and theatre designer
- Helen Bina (1912–1983), American speed skater
- Helen Binyon (1904–1979), British artist and author
- Helen L. Bostwick (1826–1907), American author, poet
- Helen Bjørnøy (born 1954), Norwegian politician
- Helen Blaby, British journalist
- Helen Black, multiple people
- Helen Blackler (1902–1981), British psychologist and museum curator
- Helen Blackwell, American chemist and molecular biologist
- Helen Blackwood, Baroness Dufferin and Claneboye (1807–1867), British songwriter, composer, poet and author
- Helen Blake (born 1951), Jamaican sprinter
- Helen Blakeman, British playwright and screenwriter
- Helen Blanchard (1840–1922), American inventor
- Helen Blane (1913–2000), British alpine skier
- Helen Blatch (1934–2015), British actress
- Helen Blau (born 1948), American biochemist
- Helen Blaxland (1907–1989), Australian charity fundraiser, heritage conservationist, skillful flower arranger and nonfiction writer
- Helen Bleazard (born 1990), Welsh footballer
- Helen Boaden (born 1956), British former broadcasting executive
- Helen Boatwright (1916–2010), American opera singer
- Helen Bond, British biblical scholar
- Helen Bonfils (1889–1972), American actress, theatrical producer, newspaper executive and philanthropist
- Helen Bonny (1921–2010), American music therapist
- Helen Boosalis (1919–2009), American politician
- Helen Borten, American author and illustrator
- Helen Bosanquet (1860–1925), British social theorist and reformer
- Helen Bøsterud (born 1940), Norwegian politician
- Helen Bostock (born 1977), New Zealand marine sedimentologist
- Helen L. Bostwick (1826–1907), American poet
- Helen McMurchie Bott, Canadian author
- Helen Bottel (1914–1999), American journalist
- Helen Boucher, American physician
- Helen Boughton-Leigh (1906–1999), American skier
- Helen Boulding (born 1978), British singer-songwriter
- Helen Bowater (born 1952), New Zealand composer
- Helen Bower, British violinist
- Helen Bower-Easton, British civil servant
- Helen Bowskill, biography of the Chief Justice of the Supreme Court of Queensland
- Helen Boyce (1918–1997), American actress
- Helen Boyd (born 1969), American memoirist
- Helen Boyle (swimmer) (1908–1970), British swimmer
- Helen Boyle (1869–1957), Irish-British physician and psychologist
- Helen Dore Boylston (1895–1984), American novelist
- Helen Brach (1911–1977), American multi-millionaire
- Helen Bradley (1900–1979), English artist
- Helen Branswell, Canadian infectious diseases and global health reporter
- Helen Bray (1889–1990), American actress
- Helen Breger (1918–2013), Austrian-born American visual artist, educator
- Helen Brew (1922–2013), New Zealand actor, birth campaigner, documentary filmmaker, educator and speech therapist for children
- Helen Briem (born 2005), German golfer
- Helen Bright, multiple people
- Helen Brinchmann (1918–2016), Norwegian actress
- Helen Brockman (1902–2008), American fashion designer
- Helen Broderick (1891–1959), American actress
- Helen Tanner Brodt (1838–1908), American painter
- Helen Broneau (1894–1972), American actress and screenwriter
- Helen Bronte-Stewart, neuroscientist
- Helen Brook (1907–1997), British advocate of birth control
- Helen Brotherton (1914–2009), English conservationist
- Helen Brotherton (vegetarian) (1812–1898), English vegetarianism activist and philanthropist
- Helen Brown, several people
- Helen Browning (born 1961), British farmer
- Helen Brownlee (born 1945), Australian Olympic Committee
- Helen Brownson (1917–2017), American information scientist
- Helen Bell Bruton (1898–1985), American visual artist
- Helen Buchholtz (1877–1953), Luxembourgish composer
- Helen Buckingham (born 1952), Australian politician
- Helen Watson Buckner (1918–1991), American philanthropist
- Helen Buday, Australian actress and singer
- Helen Foot Buell (1901–1995), American botanist and ecologist
- Helen Buhagiar, Maltese political activist and feminist
- Helen Bullard, American landscape architect
- Helen Bullock, multiple people
- Helen Burbank (1898–1981), American politician
- Helen Burgess (1916–1937), American actress
- Helen Burgess (scientist) (1951–1999), Canadian conservation scientist
- Helen Burke, Countess Clanricarde (died 1722), Irish countess
- Helen Burnet (born 1964), Tasmanian politician
- Helen Burns (1916–2018), British actress
- Helen Burt, British-Canadian pharmacist
- Helen May Butler (1867–1957), American bandleader and composer
- Helen Lehman Buttenwieser (1905–1989), American lawyer
- Helen Byrne, professor of applied mathematics
- Helen Caceres (born 1993), Australian association footballer
- Helen Caddick (1845–1927), English travel writer
- Helen Caines, physicist
- Helen Caird, Scottish curler
- Helen Calcutt (born 1988), British poet and writer
- Helen Calder, New Zealand painter
- Helen Caldicott (born 1938), Australian physician, author and anti-nuclear advocate
- Helen Caldwell (1904–1987), American poet
- Helen Calkins (1893–1970), American mathematician
- Helen Callaghan (1923–1992), Canadian baseball player
- Helen Callus, British violist
- Helen Cam (1885–1968), English historian
- Helen Cammock, English artist
- Helen Page Camp (1930–1991), American actress
- Helen Stuart Campbell (1839–1918), American author, editor, social reformer, home economist
- Helen Campo (born 1962), American flutist
- Helen Churchill Candee (1858–1949), American novelist
- Helen L. Cannon (1911–1996), American geologist
- Helen Cargill (1896–1969), British nurse and Royal Air Force officer
- Helen Carnell (born 1981), English presenter and journalist
- Helen Knipe Carpenter (1881–1959), American novelist
- Helen Carr, English journalist and emeritus professor
- Helen H. Carr (born 1988), British historian, presenter and writer
- Helen Carruthers, American actress
- Helen Carte (1852–1913), Scottish businesswoman
- Helen Strong Carter (1866–1945), First Lady of the Territory of Hawaii
- Helen Carter (1927–1998), American singer-songwriter
- Helen Casey (born 1974), British rower
- Helen Cassaday, Professor of Behavioural Neuroscience
- Helen Castor (born 1968), English historian
- Helen Cattanach (1920–1994), British nursing administrator
- Helen Tunnicliff Catterall (1870–1933), American lawyer
- Helen Cha-Pyo, American conductor
- Helen Chadwick (1953–1996), English artist
- Helen Chadwick (musician), British composer and singer
- Helen Chamberlain (born 1967), English television presenter
- Helen Chambers (1879–1935), British pathologist
- Helen M. Chan, British engineer and materials scientist
- Helen Chandler (1906–1965), American actress
- Helen Mack Chang (born 1952), Guatemalan activist
- Helen Chang (born 1954), Taiwanese politician
- Helen Burwell Chapin (1892–1950), American scholar
- Helen C. Chase, American public health statistician
- Helen Chasin (1938–2015), American poet
- Helen Fabela Chávez (1928–2016), American labor activist
- Helen Chenevix (1886–1963), Irish suffragist and trade unionist
- Helen Chenoweth-Hage (1938–2006), American politician
- Helen Cherry (1915–2001), English actress
- Helen Maria Chesnutt (1880–1969), African-American teacher of Latin
- Helen Krich Chinoy (1922–2010), American historian
- Helen Chow (born 1965), Malaysian swimmer
- Helen Christensen, Australian mental health researcher
- Helen Christie (1914–1995), British actress
- Helen Christinson, Australian-born actress
- Helen Y. Chu, American immunologist
- Helen Claire (1905–1974), American actress
- Helen Clapcott, English painter
- Helen Clare (1916–2018), English singer
- Helen Clark, several people
- Helen Clarke, several people
- Helen Clayton (born 1971), English rugby union player
- Helen Cleugh, atmospheric scientist
- Helen Clevenger (1917–1936), American murder victim
- Helen Clitheroe (born 1974), British middle and long-distance runner
- Helen Mary Coaton, British artist
- Helen Lavinia Cochrane (1868–1946), British painter
- Helen Codere (1917–2009), American cultural anthropologist
- Helen Coghlan, Australian magician
- Helen Cohan (1910–1996), American actress
- Helen Cole (1922–2004), American politician
- Helen Colin (1923–2016), Polish-born American Holocaust survivor
- Helen Collins (born 1988), New Zealand association footballer
- Helen Field Comstock (1840–1930), American poet, philanthropist
- Helen S. Conant (1839–1899), American poet
- Helen Conkling, American poet
- Helen Connolly, British businesswoman
- Helen Connon (1860–1903), New Zealand women's education pioneer
- Helen Conrad (born 1944), American novelist
- Helen Conway-Ottenheimer, Canadian politician
- Helen Hoppner Coode, English illustrator
- Helen Appo Cook (1837–1913), African-American community activist
- Helen Cooke (1943–2021), American scientist
- Helen Coonan (born 1947), Australian politician
- Helen Cooper, multiple people
- Helen Corbitt (1906–1978), American chef and cookbook author
- Helen Cordero (1915–1994), Cochiti Pueblo potter
- Helen Corey (1923–2024), American cookbook author
- Helen Corke, English writer and schoolteacher
- Helen Cornelius (1941–2025), American singer-songwriter
- Helen Courtney (1952–2020), New Zealand cartoonist
- Helen Covensky, Polish-American painter
- Helen Cowie, multiple people
- Helen Crabb (1891–1972), New Zealand artist and art teacher
- Helen Crabtree (1915–2002), American equestrian
- Helen Millar Craggs (1888–1969), British suffragette and pharmacist, later 2nd Baroness Pethick-Lawrence
- Helen Craig (writer) (born 1934), English children's book illustrator and author
- Helen Craig (actress) (1912–1986), American actress
- Helen Craik, Scottish poet and novelist
- Helen Crawfurd (1877–1954), Scottish suffragette
- Helen Creighton (1899–1989), Canadian folklorist
- Helen Cresswell (1934–2005), English children's writer
- Helen Crook (born 1971), British tennis player
- Helen Cross, several people
- Helen Gray Crotwell (1925–2006), American campus minister
- Helen Croydon, British author, broadcaster and journalist
- Helen Cruickshank (1886–1975), Scottish poet and suffragette
- Helen F. Cullen (1919–2007), American mathematician
- Helen Cunliffe, British Anglican priest
- Helen Curry (1896–1931), American stage actress
- Helen Noble Curtis, American activist, service worker, educator and speaker
- Helen Cutler (1923–1990), Australian philanthropist
- Helen Czerski (born 1978), British physicist, oceanographer and television presenter
- Helen Dacre, British scientist and athlete
- Helen Dahm (1878–1968), Swiss artist
- Helen Dale, Australian writer and lawyer
- Helen Dalley, Australian journalist
- Helen Dallimore (born 1971), Australian actress
- Helen Dalrymple (1883–1943), New Zealand botanist, author and teacher
- Helen Dalton, Australian politician
- Helen Daly (born 1976), New Zealand cricketer
- Helen D'Amato, Maltese politician and educator
- Helen Damico (1931–2020), American literary scholar
- Helen Oakley Dance (1913–2001), Canadian-American jazz journalist, record producer and music historian
- Helen Danesh-Meyer, New Zealand ophthalmologist
- Helen Metcalf Danforth (1887–1984), American college president
- Helen Daniels, fictional character from the Australian soap opera Neighbours
- Helen Dannetun (born 1957), Swedish professor
- Helen Darbishire, English literary scholar
- Helen Darling (born 1978), American basketball player
- Helen Darling (singer) (born 1965), American singer-songwriter
- Helen Dauvray (1859–1923), American actress
- Helen David, British fashion designer
- Helen Joy Davidman (1915–1960), American poet and writer
- Helen Davies, multiple people
- Helen Gordon Davis (1926–2015), American actress and politician from Florida
- Helen Rose Dawson (1927–2022), American professor
- Helen De Cruz (1978–2025), Belgian philosopher
- Helen de Hoop, Dutch linguist
- Helen Reed de Laporte (1864–1936), American educator and politician
- Helen De Michiel (born 1953), American director and producer
- Helen Wendler Deane (1917–1966), American histochemist
- Helen Deem (1900–1955), New Zealand medical doctor, medical officer, Plunket medical adviser and university lecturer
- Helen Deloge, American politician
- Helen DeMacque (born 1958), British pop singer
- Helen Denerley (born 1956), Scottish sculptor
- Helen Denman (born 1976), Australian swimmer
- Helen Elise Smith Dett (1888–1950), American pianist and music educator
- Helen Dettweiler (1914–1990), American professional golfer
- Helen Deutsch (1906–1992), American screenwriter
- Helen DeVos (1927–2017), American philanthropist and political donor
- Helen Dewar (1936–2006), American newspaper reporter
- Helen DeWitt (born 1957), American novelist
- Helen Octavia Dickens (1909–2001), American physician
- Helen Dickie, American physician
- Helen Diemer, American architectural lighting designer
- Helen Dillon, Scottish and Irish gardener and media personality
- Helen Dimsdale (1907–1977), British neurologist
- Helen Dinerman (1920–1974), American sociologist
- Helen Dingman (1885–1978), American academic and social worker
- Helen Doan (1911–2024), Canadian supercentenarian
- Helen Dobson (born 1971), English golfer
- Helen Campbell D'Olier, Scottish artist and illustrator
- Helen Don-Duncan (born 1981), English swimmer
- Helen Donald-Smith (1852–1933), English artist
- Helen Donaldson (born 1968), Australian operatic soprano
- Helen Donath (born 1940), American opera singer
- Helen Donis-Keller, biology and art professor
- Helen Doron (born 1955), British linguist and educator
- Helen Gahagan Douglas (1900–1980), American actress and politician
- Helen Douglas, Scottish book artist
- Helen Dowdy, American actress
- Helen Doyle, Canadian documentary filmmaker
- Helen Dragas, business executive and university rector
- Helen Avis Drexel (1911–1974), American silent film actress
- Helen Margaret Druce (1921–2010), New Zealand teacher, tramper, botanist and botanical collector
- Helen Drutt (born 1930), American gallery owner and collector of contemporary jewelry
- Helen Dryden (1882–1972), American artist
- Helen Duhamel (1904–1991), American broadcaster
- Helen Savier DuMond (1872–1968), American painter
- Helen Dunbar (1863–1933), American actress
- Helen Duncan, several people
- Helen Dunmore (1952–2017), British writer
- Helen Durham, Australian lawyer
- Helen Winslow Durkee, American painter
- Helen Dyer (1895–1998), American biochemist
- Helen Eadie (1947–2013), Scottish politician
- Helen Eager (born 1952), Australian artist
- Helen Eastman (1863–1953), American botanist
- Helen Gilbert Ecob, American writer and suffragist
- Helen Jerome Eddy (1897–1990), American actress
- Helen Edlund (born 1968), Swedish female curler
- Helen G. Edmonds (1911–1995), American scholar
- Helen Edmundson (born 1964), British playwright and screenwriter
- Helen Edwards, multiple people
- Helen Merrill Egerton (1866–1951), Canadian writer
- Helen Ekins (1879–1964), British horticulturist and educational administrator
- Helen Elele (born 1973), Kenyan volleyball player
- Helen Eley, American actress and singer
- Helen Elleker (born 1956), English track and field athlete
- Helen Elliot (1927–2013), Scottish table tennis player
- Helen Elliott (born 1949), Filipino swimmer
- Helen Ellis, American writer
- Helen Engelstad (1908–1989), Norwegian author, art historian and educator
- Helen Engle (1926–2019), American conservationist
- Helen Ennis, Australian photography curator, historian, critic and art writer
- Helen Epstein (born 1947), American writer of memoir, journalism and biography
- Helen Epstein (journalist) (born 1961), American professor and journalist
- Helén Eriksen (born 1971), Norwegian jazz musician, songwriter and music arranger
- Helen Ernstone (1840–1933), English actress
- Helen Escobedo (1934–2010), Mexican sculptor
- Helen Estabrook, American film producer
- Helen Esuene (born 1949), Nigerian politician
- Helen Eustis (1916–2015), American novelist
- Helen C. Evans, American art historian
- Helen Fagerström (born 1977), Swedish footballer
- Helen Fairbrother, British model
- Helen Fairchild (1885–1918), American nurse
- Helen Faison (1924–2015), American educator
- Helen Fancher (born 1931), American politician
- Helen Farish (born 1962), British poet
- Helen Farquhar (1859–1953), British numismatist
- Helen Farr, British maritime archeologist
- Helen M. Feeney (1919–2004), American nun
- Helen Fein (1934–2022), American sociologist
- Helen Wilson Fell (1849–1935), Scottish-born Australian diarist and philanthropist
- Helen Fenby (born 1998), English cricketer
- Helen Munro Ferguson, Viscountess Novar (1865–1941), President and founder of the Red Cross leader
- Helen Ferguson (1901–1977), American actress
- Helen Aguirre Ferré, American journalist
- Helen Ferrers (1869–1943), British actress
- Helen Feyler-Switz (1925–2006), American artist
- Helen Fielding (born 1958), English novelist and screenwriter
- Helen H. Fielding, professor and Head of Physical Chemistry
- Helen Fields, English writer
- Helen Filarski (1924–2014), American baseball player
- Helen Firth, British geneticist
- Helen Fischer (1912–1986), American politician
- Helen Fisher, multiple people
- Helen G. Fisk (1895–1986), American vocational support executive
- Helen FitzGerald, Australian writer
- Helen Fix (1922–2019), American politician
- Helen Flanagan (born 1990), English actress
- Helen Flanders, multiple people
- Helen Fleming (born 1973), South African rower
- Helen Fletcher (1931–2022), British tennis player
- Helen Thomas Flexner (1871–1956), American writer and educator
- Helen Flint (1898–1967), American actress
- Helen Fløisand (born 1952), Norwegian politician
- Helen Liu Fong (1927–2005), American architect
- Helen Katharine Forbes (1891–1945), American painter
- Helen Ford (1894–1982), American actress
- Helen Forde, English archaeologist
- Helen Forrest (1917–1999), American pop singer
- Helen Forrester (1919–2011), Anglo-Canadian author
- Helen Fospero (born 1966), English television presenter
- Helen Foster, multiple people
- Helen Fowler, Australian writer
- Helen Fox, multiple people
- Helen Frank (swimmer) (born 1971), British swimmer
- Helen Frank, American artist
- Helen Frankenthaler (1928–2011), American painter
- Helen Lee Franklin (1895–1949), American women's rights activist
- Helen Fraser, multiple people
- Helen C. Frederick, American artist
- Helen Murray Free (1923–2021), American chemist and educator
- Helen Freedhoff (1940–2017), Canadian theoretical physicist
- Helen Freedman, American lawyer
- Helen Freeman, multiple people
- Helen French, multiple people
- Helen Clay Frick (1888–1984), American philanthropist and art collector
- Helen Fricker (born 1969), American glaciologist and professor
- Helen Friedman, American psychologist
- Helen Frith (born 1939), Australian athlete
- Helen Frost (born 1949), American writer and poet
- Helen Frost (athlete) (born 1974), British sprinter
- Helen Losanitch Frothingham (1885–1972), Serbian humanitarian aid worker, women's rights activist, nurse and writer
- Helen Frye, multiple people
- Helen Fulton, professor of medieval literature
- Helen Fouché Gaines (1888–1940), member of the American Cryptogram Association and editor of the book Cryptanalysis
- Helen Gallagher (1926–2024), American actress and singer
- Helen Gamboa (born 1945), Filipina actress
- Helen Gandy (1897–1988), American civil servant
- Helen Ganser, American librarian
- Helen Ganzarolli (born 1979), Brazilian television presenter
- Helen K. Garber, American photographer
- Helen Gardiner (1938–2008), Canadian philanthropist and co-founder of the Gardiner Museum of Ceramic Art
- Helen Gardner, multiple people
- Helen Newell Garfield (1867–1930), American socialite and advocate
- Helen Garner (born 1942), Australian author
- Helen Garrett (1929–2006), American politician
- Helen Eliza Benson Garrison (1811–1876), American abolitionist
- Helen Gatch (1861–1942), American photographer
- Helen Manchester Gates, American writer, translator and dramatist
- Helen Geake (born 1967), British archaeologist
- Helen Gee, multiple people
- Helen Thornton Geer (1903–1983), American librarian
- Helen George (born 1984), English actress
- Helen Gerardia, Russian-American painter
- Helen Ghosh (born 1956), British civil servant
- Helen Gibb (1838–1914), New Zealand farmer, accommodation-house keeper and postmistress
- Helen Gibson (1892–1977), American actress
- Helen Gichohi, Kenyan environmentalist
- Helen Giddings, American politician
- Helen Gifford (born 1935), Australian composer
- Helen Gilbert (actress) (1915–1995), American actress
- Helen Gilbert (artist) (1922–2002), American sculptor
- Helen Gilby (born 1974), British canoeist
- Helen Margaret Gilkey (1886–1972), American botanist, mycologist and scientific illustrator
- Helen Elizabeth Gillan (c. 1873–1955), Australian voluntary worker and social reformer
- Helen Gilleaudeau, American tennis player
- Helen Gillespie (1898–1974), British military nurse
- Helen Gillette (1919–1991), American politician
- Helen Gilliland (1897–1942), Northern Irish actress and singer
- Helen W. Gillmor (born 1942), American judge
- Helen Gilmore (magazine editor) (1900–1947), American actress and journalist
- Helen Gilmore (c. 1872–1936), American actress
- Helen L. Gilson, American nurse
- Helen Gilyard (born 1961), English swimmer
- Helen Lachs Ginsburg (1929–2020), American economist and activist
- Helen Gipson (born 1961), Scottish Scrabble player
- Helen Gladstone (1849–1925), British educationist
- Helen Jane Gladstone, 19th-century British convert to Roman Catholicism from Anglicanism
- Helen Glass (1917–2015), Canadian nurse
- Helen Glatz (1908–1996), English composer and pianist
- Helen Glaves, British data scientist
- Helen Gleeson, British physicist
- Helen Gloag (1750–c. 1790), Moroccan Royal slave consort
- Helen Glover (born 1986), British rower
- Helen Glover (Survivor contestant) (born 1955), American reality TV contestant
- Helen Iglauer Glueck, American physician
- Helen Godwin, British politician
- Helen Golay (born 1931), American woman who murdered two homeless men for life insurance money
- Helen Golden, multiple people
- Helen Goodman (born 1958), British former labour politician
- Helen Gordon, multiple people
- Helen Goss (1903–1985), British actress
- Helen M. Gougar (1843–1907), American lawyer
- Helen Gouldby (born 1968), British swimmer
- Helen Gourlay (born 1946), Australian tennis player
- Helen Grace (born 1971), British actress
- Helen Grace (director), Welsh film director
- Helen Graham, multiple people
- Helen Grant, several people
- Helen Gray, several people
- Helen Grayco (1924–2022), American singer
- Helen Grayson, American documentary filmmaker
- Helen Greaves, British TV producer and writer
- Helen Hoy Greeley (1878–1965), American suffragist, lawyer and activist
- Helen Green (died 1991), American politician
- Helen H. Green, American politician and temperance activist
- Helen Gregg, American screenwriter
- Helen Frances Gregor (1921–1989), Czech-Canadian artist
- Helen Gregory (medical missionary) (1898–1946), Scottish medical missionary
- Helen Greiner (born 1967), American computer scientist
- Helen Loring Grenfell (1866–1935), American educator
- Helen E. Grenga (1938–2006), chemistry professor
- Helen Griffin (1958–2018), Welsh actress, playwright and screenwriter
- Helen Griffith (1882–1976), American professor
- Helen Sherman Griffith (1873–1961), American author
- Helen Grime, Scottish composer
- Helen Grimshaw (1904–1987), British aeronautical engineer
- Helen Grindrod (1936–2002), British judge
- Helen Grobert (born 1992), German cyclist
- Helen Groger-Wurm, Austrian-Australian ethnologist, anthropologist and linguist
- Helen Gross (1896–?), American blues singer
- Helen Kleberg Groves (1927–2022), horsewoman and cattle rancher
- Helen Lee Gruehl (1902–1983), American biochemist
- Helen Grundlingh, South African lawn bowler
- Helen G. Grundman, American mathematician
- Helen C. Gunsaulus (1886–1954), American curator
- Helen Gwynne-Vaughan (1879–1967), British mycologist and botanist
- Helen Gym (born 1968), American politician
- Helen Mayer Hacker, sociologist and author
- Helen Hadsell (1924–2010), American contesting personality
- Helen Haenke (1916–1978), Australian artist, poet and playwright
- Helen Eugenia Hagan (1891–1964), American composer
- Helen Haig-Brown, Canadian filmmaker
- Helen E. Haines (1872–1961), American librarian
- Helen Haines (born 1961), Australian politician
- Helen Hakena (born 1955), organiser and campaigner for peace and women's rights from Bougainville, Papua New Guinea
- Helen Hall, American auctioneer and appraiser
- Helen Morgan Hamilton (1896–1985), socialite and army officer
- Helen Hamilton (c. 1874–1949), American lawyer
- Helen Hamlin (1917–2004), American author
- Helen Hamlyn (born 1934), English philanthropist
- Helen Hampton (1921–1971), New Zealand diplomat
- Helen Hanft (1934–2013), American actress
- Helen Hanson (1874–1926), British physician, missionary and feminist
- Helen Hardacre (born 1949), American Japanologist
- Helen Hardin (1943–1984), American painter
- Helen Harris, multiple people
- Helen A. Harrison (born 1943), American art historian, curator, journalist and author
- Helen Harrison-Bristol (1909–1995), Canadian pilot, civil aviation instructor, Air Transport Auxiliary ferry pilot during World War II.
- Helen Hart, multiple people
- Helen Hartley, multiple people
- Helen Haste (born 1943), British psychologist
- Helen Howard Hatton (1859–1955), English artist
- Helen Scott Hay (1869–1932), American nurse
- Helen Haye (1874–1957), British actress
- Helen Hayes, several people
- Helen Hays (1931–2025), American ornithologist and conservationist
- Helen Haywood, English artist and writer
- Helen Head, American politician
- Helen Hearnden (born 1954), Irish cricketer
- Helen Heath, New Zealand poet
- Helen Heckman (1898–1975), American dancer
- Helen Hedges, New Zealand education academic
- Helen Heffernan, New Zealand microbiologist
- Helen West Heller (c. 1872–1955), American painter
- Helen Hemphill (born 1955), American writer
- Helen Henderson, multiple people
- Helen Heney (1907–1990), Australian historian
- Helen Palmer Henley (1903–1976), American journalist
- Helen Heng (1933–2018), Singaporean badminton player
- Helen Herr (c. 1907–1999), American politician
- Helen Herrman, Australian psychiatrist
- Helen Heslop, New Zealand physician-scientist
- Helen Margaret Hewitt (1900–1977), American musicologist and music educator
- Helen Joan Hewson (1938–2007), Australian botanist and botanical illustrator
- Helen Hicks (1911–1974), American professional golfer
- Helen Hiebert, American book artist
- Helen Hild (1926–1984), American professional wrestler
- Helen Hilderley, British Paralympic athlete
- Helen Hill (1970–2007), American artist, filmmaker, writer, teacher and social activist
- Helen Hills, British art historian and academic
- Helen Hillyard, British curator and art historian
- Helen Hindpere, Estonian writer
- Helen Kotas Hirsch (1916–2000), American horn player
- Helen Hitchings (1920–2002), New Zealand art dealer
- Helen Hoang (born 1982), American novelist
- Helen Hoang (economist), Vietnamese-Australian economist and author
- Helen Hobbs (born 1952), American medical researcher
- Helen Hodgman (1945–2022), Australian novelist
- Helen Hodgson (born 1961), Australian politician
- Helen E. Hoens, American judge
- Helen Hoffmann (born 2002), German cross-country skier
- Helen Hogan (1923–2025), New Zealand educator and researcher
- Helen Sawyer Hogg (1905–1993), American-Canadian astronomer
- Helen E. Hokinson (1893–1949), American cartoonist
- Helen Hollick (born 1953), British author of historical fiction
- Helen Holm (1907–1971), Scottish amateur golfer
- Helen Holmes, multiple people
- Helen Holt, multiple people
- Helen Homans (1877–1949), American tennis player
- Helen Hong (born 1974), American comedian, actress, director and producer
- Helen Francis Hood (1863–1949), American pianist and composer
- Helen Hooker (1905–1993), American sculptor and painter
- Helen Hoover (1910–1984), American nature writer
- Helen Hopekirk, American classical composer
- Helen Lefkowitz Horowitz (born 1942), American historian
- Helen Horton (1923–2007), American actress
- Helen Housby (born 1995), English netball player
- Helen Augusta Howard (1865–1934), American suffragist and philanthropist
- Helen Howard (1903–1927), American actress
- Helen Howe (1905–1975), American novelist, biographer and monologist
- Helen Hoyt, American poet
- Helen Huang (born 1982), American classical pianist
- Helen Schaeffer Huff (1883–1913), American physicist
- Helen Hughes, multiple people
- Helen Huntington Hull (1893–1976), American socialite, patron of arts and political hostess
- Helen Rose Hull (1888–1971), American novelist
- Helen Humes (1913–1981), American singer
- Helen Humphreys (born 1961), Canadian poet and novelist
- Helen Hunley (1920–2010), Canadian politician
- Helen Hunt, several people
- Helen Marr Hurd (1839–1909), American educator, poet
- Helen Hutchinson, Canadian television personality
- Helen Hyde (1868–1919), American etcher and engraver
- Helen von Kolnitz Hyer (1896–1983), American poet
- Helen Uche Ibezim (born 1964), Nigerian author and educator
- Helen Idahosa (born 1972), Nigerian weightlifter
- Helen Infeld (1907–1993), American mathematician
- Helen Douglas Irvine (1880–1946), Scottish novelist
- Helen Irving (born 1954), Australian constitutional lawyer and academic
- Helen Parker-Jayne Isibor, Nigerian-British opera singer
- Helen Ivory, English poet, artist, tutor and editor
- Helen Jackson, multiple people
- Helen Jacobs (1908–1997), American tennis player
- Helen Mary Jacobs, British children's illustrator
- Helen Jacobsohn (born 1945), Australian canoeist
- Helen Smythe Jaffray (1850–1932), American socialite
- Helen Jahren (born 1959), Swedish oboist
- Helen F. James (born 1956), American paleontologist and pale-ornithologist
- Helen G. James, American equality activist
- Helen Jameson (born 1963), English swimmer
- Helen Jamet, medical entomologist
- Helen Varley Jamieson, digital media artist, playwright, performer, director and producer
- Helen Jamieson (born 1946), British former alpine skier
- Helen Javorski (1909–2008), American politician
- Helen Brush Jenkins (1919–2013), American photographer
- Helen Jenkins (born 1984), Welsh triathlete
- Helen Hall Jennings (1905–1966), American psychologist
- Helen Jepkurgat (born 1989), Kenyan athlete
- Helen Jepson (1904–1997), American opera singer
- Helen Jerome (1883–1966), British-Australian journalist, author and playwright
- Helen Jewett, 19th-century New York City prostitute and murder victim
- Helen Johansson (born 1965), Swedish footballer
- Helen John (1937–2017), British peace activist
- Helen Johns (born 1953), Canadian politician
- Helen Johns (swimmer) (1914–2014), American swimmer
- Helen Johnson, multiple people
- Helén Johnsson, Swedish ten-pin bowler
- Helen Johnston (1891–1969), American physician
- Helen Jonas-Rosenzweig (1925–2018), Polish-American holocaust survivor
- Helen Jones, several people
- Helen Haiman Joseph (1888–1978), American puppeteer and author
- Helen Joseph (boxer) (born 1989), Nigerian boxer
- Helen Joseph (1905–1992), South African anti-apartheid activist
- Helen Joyce, Irish journalist and author
- Helen Kalandadze, Georgian television presenter
- Helen Kales, geriatric psychiatrist and researcher
- Helen Kalvak (c. 1901–1984), Canadian Inuk graphic artist
- Helen Lake Kanahele (1916–1976), American labor organizer
- Helen Kane (1904–1966), American singer
- Helen Kapalos (born 1971), Australian journalist and television presenter
- Helen Singer Kaplan (1929–1995), Austrian-American psychiatrist and sex therapist
- Helen Kapp (1901–1978), British artist
- Helen Karagounis (born 1981), British athlete
- Helen Kayser, Australian tennis player
- Helen Kearney (born 1989), Irish Paralympic equestrian
- Helen Kedgley, New Zealand art curator and gallery director
- Helen Keen, English alternative comedian
- Helen Keiser (1926–2013), Swiss writer, painter and photographer
- Helen Kelesi (born 1969), Canadian tennis player
- Helen Keller, several people
- Helen Kelly, several people
- Helen Kemp (1918–2015), American voice teacher, church music pedagogue, composer and children's choir clinician
- Helen Kendall (1892–1985), Canadian military nurse
- Helen Kennedy, Canadian politician
- Helen Kennedy (bishop), English-born Canadian bishop
- Helen Kennedy (botanist) (born 1944), American botanist
- Helen Kennedy (swimmer) (born 1949), Canadian swimmer
- Helen Keogh (born 1951), Irish former politician
- Helen Kerly (1916–1992), British Air Transport Auxiliary pilot officer in the Second World War
- Helen Kerwin (born 1947), American politician
- Helen Ketola (1931–2016), American baseball player
- Helen Kevric (born 2008), German artistic gymnast
- Helen Keynes (1892–1975), British political activist and author
- Helen Khal (1923–2009), American-Lebanese painter
- Helen Zerin Khan, Bangladeshi politician
- Helen Kijo-Bisimba, Tanzanian human rights activist
- Helen Kilpatrick (born 1958), British civil servant
- Helen Kim (c. 1899–1970), Korean educator
- Helen Kim (actress) (1907–1937), American actress
- Hellen Kimaiyo (born 1968), Kenyan runner
- Helen Mar Kimball (1828–1896), wife of Joseph Smith Jr.
- Helen Kimble, Africanist and campaigner
- Helen King, multiple people
- Helen Kinne (1861–1917), American home economist
- Helen Kinnear (1894–1970), Canadian lawyer and judge
- Helen Kirk, Scottish performer, temperance worker, juvenile magazine editor and religious writer
- Helen Kirkpatrick (1909–1997), American war correspondent
- Helen Johns Kirtland (1890–1979), American photojournalist and war correspondent
- Helen Binney Kitchel (1890–1990), American politician and writer
- Helen Klaassen (1865–1951), English physicist
- Helen Klanderud (1937–2013), American politician and social worker
- Helen Klaos (born 1983), Estonian badminton player
- Helen Kleeb (1907–2003), American actress
- Helen Whitaker Fowle Knight (1869–1948), First Lady of North Carolina
- Helen Knight (1899–1984), British philosopher
- Helen Knott, Canadian writer and poet
- Helen M. Knowlton (1832–1918), American writer
- Helen Knubel (1901–1992), American archivist
- Helen L. Koch (1895–1977), American psychologist
- Helen Konek, Inuk elder
- Helen Koppell (born 1955), British diver
- Helen L. Koss (1922–2008), Maryland politician
- Helen Kleinbort Krauze (1937–2024), Polish-born Mexican Jewish journalist
- Helen Tamy Kreuzer (born 1998), German professional golfer
- Helen Kroger (born 1959), Australian politician
- Helen Aldrich De Kroyft (1818–1915), American author
- Helen Kurup (born 1986), English actress
- Helen Kushnick (1945–1996), American talent agent
- Helen Kwalwasser (1927–2017), American violinist
- Helen La Lime, American diplomat
- Helen Lackaye (1883–1940), American actress
- Helen Lackner, British writer and academic
- Helen Ladd, education economist
- Helen LaFrance (1919–2020), African American artist
- Helen Laird (1874–1957), Irish actress, costumer and teacher
- Helen M. Laird (1931–2020), electron-microscopist
- Helen Chaman Lall (1910 or 1911–2003), Indian art collector
- Helen Humes Lamale (1912–1998), American labor statistician
- Helen Adelaide Lamb (1893–1981), Scottish artist
- Helen Lamb (1956–2017), Scottish poet
- Helen Lamoela, South African politician and educator
- Helen Landgarten (1921–2011), American psychotherapist, art therapy pioneer
- Helen Lane (1921–2004), American translator
- Helen S. Lang (1947–2016), American philosopher
- Helen Langehanenberg (born 1982), American dressage rider
- Helen Langton, British academic
- Helen Langworthy (1899–1991), American theater director
- Helen K. Larson, Australian ichthyologist
- Helen Latham (born 1976), English actress
- Helen Laupa (born 1976), Estonian tennis player
- Helen Hull Law (1890–1966), American college professor of Latin and Greek
- Helen Lawrenson (1907–1982), American journalist
- Helen Leach (1945–2026), New Zealand food anthropologist
- Helen Leahey (born 1987), Welsh singer and voice over artist
- Helen Leake (born 1949), Australian film producer
- Helen Lederer (born 1954), British comedian
- Helen Lee, multiple people
- Helen Shores Lee (1941–2018), American jurist and lawyer
- Helen Lemmens-Sherrington (1834–1906), English soprano
- Helen Lempriere (1907–1991), Australian artist and sculptor
- Helen Lengfeld, American golfer
- Helen Lenskyj (born 1943), Canadian sociologist and historian
- Helen Leslie (1897–?), American actress
- Helen Lessore (1907–1994), English painter
- Helen Lester, American children's writer
- Helen Phillips Levin (1924–1985), American activist and philosopher
- Helen Levine (1923–2018), Canadian feminist and academic
- Helen Levinthal, pioneering rabbinical scholarship
- Helen Levitt (1913–2009), American photographer
- Helen Lewis, multiple people
- Helen Leyton, British pathologist
- Helen Liddell (born 1950), British Labour Party politician
- Helen Lieros (1940–2021), Zimbabwean visual artist
- Helen Lin (born 1939), Taiwanese politician
- Helen Lindes (born 1981), Spanish model
- Helen Lindroth (1874–1956), American actress
- Helen Lines (1918–2001), American astronomer
- Helen Ling (born 1928), software engineer
- Helen Lingard, Australian scientist
- Helen Drage Little (1871–1933), English fundraiser
- Helen Littleboy, British film director
- Helen Littleworth (born 1966), New Zealand hockey and rugby union player
- Helen Litton, Irish historian and author
- Helen Lochhead, Australian architect
- Helen Niña Tappan Loeblich (1917–2004), American micropaleontologist
- Helen Logan (1906–1989), American screenwriter
- Helen Lokuta (born 1975), Estonian opera singer
- Helen Loney, archaeologist
- Helen Jane Long (born 1974), British composer, musician and pianist
- Helen Longino (born 1944), American philosopher of science
- Helen Dortch Longstreet (1863–1962), American newspaper editor, publisher
- Helen Longworth (born 1976), British actress
- Helen Lovatt, scholar of Latin literature
- Helen Lowe, New Zealand novelist
- Helen Lowe (chartered accountant) (1897–1997), Scottish accountant, charity worker and activist
- Helen Tracy Lowe-Porter (1876–1963), American translator
- Helen Lowell (1866–1937), American actress
- Helen Lower (born 1970), English table tennis player
- Helen Lowry, American spy
- Helen H. Lu, Chinese-American biomedical engineer
- Helen Lucas (1931–2023), Canadian painter and writer
- Helen Lucas (philanthropist) (1835–1918), British philanthropist and social worker
- Helen Wong Lum (1931–2015), American tennis player
- Helen Lundeberg (1908–1999), American painter
- Helen Luz (born 1972), Brazilian basketball player
- Helen Lynch (1900–1965), American actress
- Helen Lynd (actress) (1902–1992), American actress
- Helen Lynd (1896–1982), American sociologist and social philosopher
- Helen Ma, several people
- Helen MacDonald, several people
- Helen Macfarlane (1818–1860), Scottish feminist journalist and philosopher
- Helen Gregory MacGill (1864–1947), Canadian judge and writer
- Helen MacGillivray, Australian statistician and statistics educator
- Helen MacInnes (1907–1985), Scottish-American author
- Helen Mack (1913–1986), American actress
- Helen Mackay (1891–1965), British pediatrician
- Helen Mackay (sculptor) (1897–1973), British sculptor
- Helen MacKellar (1895–1966), American actress
- Helen Mackenzie, several people
- Helen MacLeod (1980–2018), Scottish harp player
- Helen MacMurchy (1862–1953), Canadian doctor and author
- Helen MacNamara, British civil servant
- Helen MacRae (active 1909–1914), British suffragette
- Helen Maguire (born 1977), British politician
- Helen Mahon-Stroud (born 1968), New Zealand netball coach
- Helen Mair (1924–2016), English physician and author
- Helen Makhuba, South African politician
- Helen Makower (1910–1998), British economist
- Helen Maksagak (1931–2009), Canadian politician
- Helen Malcolm (1873–1934), British Girl Guiding and YWCA executive
- Helen Herrick Malsed (1910–1998), American toy inventor
- Helen Douglas Mankin (1896–1956), American politician
- Helen Taft Manning (1891–1987), American art historian
- Helen Manning (1919–2008), Native American writer
- Helen A. Manville (1839–1912), American poet
- Helen Manyeneng, Botswana politician
- Helen Maolo (born 1988), Bolivian footballer
- Helen Marcus (1925–2023), American photographer
- Helen Marden, American artist
- Helen Margetts (born 1961), political scientist
- Helen Margolis, British physicist
- Helen Marlborough (1867–1955), American actress
- Helen Marnie (born 1978), Scottish musician
- Helen Marot (1865–1940), American librarian and workers rights activist
- Helen Maroulis (born 1991), American freestyle wrestler
- Helen Marshall, several people
- Helen Marten (silent film actor)
- Helen Marten (born 1985), English artist
- Helen Martin, several people
- Helen Mary (born 1977), Indian field hockey player
- Helen Mason, several people
- Helen Masters (born 1963), English actress
- Helen Matlanyane (born 1956), South African politician
- Helen Matthews, Scottish suffragette and footballer
- Helen Maudsley (born 1927), Australian artist
- Helen May (born 1947), New Zealand education academic
- Helen S. Mayberg (born 1956), American neurologist
- Helen Mayer (1932–2008), Australian politician
- Helen Mayfield (1939–1997), American artist
- Helen Mayhew, British radio presenter and producer
- Helen Maynard-Casely, Australian instrument scientist
- Helen Mayo (1878–1967), Australian medical doctor and medical educator
- Helen Walker McAndrew (1825–1906), American physician
- Helen McCall (1899–1956), Canadian photographer
- Helen McCarthy (born 1951), British journalist and anime writer
- Helen McClory, Scottish writer
- Helen McCloy (1904–1994), American novelist
- Helen McCookerybook, British musician and singer
- Helen McCrory (1968–2021), English actress
- Helen McCully (1902–1977), Canadian writer
- Helen McDermott, British radio and television presenter
- Helen McEntee (born 1986), Irish politician
- Helen McFie, British rower
- Helen McGrath (1942–2001), Scottish trade unionist
- Helen McGregor, multiple people
- Helen McKay, British singer
- Helen McKay (plant physiologist), British scientist
- Helen McKie, British artist and illustrator
- Helen McLean (1927–2017), Canadian author and painter
- Helen E. McMillan (1909–1984), American politician
- Helen McNicoll (1879–1915), Canadian impressionist painter
- Helen McShane, British virologist
- Helen Meany (1904–1991), American diver
- Helen Farnsworth Mears (1872–1916), American sculptor
- Helen Medlyn, New Zealand opera singer
- Helen Meechie (1938–2000), British general
- Helen Megaw (1907–2002), Irish x-ray crystallographer
- Helen Meier (1929–2021), Swiss writer
- Helen Meinardi (1909–1997), American screenwriter
- Helen Meles, Eritrean singer and actress
- Helen Menken (1901–1966), American actress
- Helen Abbot Merrill (1864–1949), American mathematician and writer
- Helen Maud Merrill (1865–1943), American litterateur, poet
- Helen Merrill (born 1929), American jazz vocalist
- Helen Bigelow Merriman (1844–1933), American painter
- Helen Metcalf (1946–2003), British academic, educator and politician
- Helen Chapin Metz (1928–2011), American editor and Middle East analyst
- Helen Meyer (born 1954), American judge
- Helen Stevenson Meyner (1928–1997), American politician
- Helen Abbott Michael (1857–1904), American chemist and physician
- Helen Michaelis (1905–1965), American Quarter Horse trainer
- Helen Michaluk (1930–2022), Belarusian émigré
- Helen Vaughn Michel, American chemist
- Helen Bell Milburn (1887–1986), Canadian radiologist
- Helen Miles (born 1967), Welsh sprinter
- Helen Miller, multiple people
- Helen Milligan (born 1962), Scottish-New Zealand chess master
- Helen Milliken (1922–2012), First Lady of Michigan
- Helen Milner, American political scientist
- Helen Milroy, Australian psychiatrist
- Helen Mirra (born 1970), American artist
- Helen Mirren (born 1945), English actress
- Helen S. Mitchell (1895–1984), American nutritionist
- Helen Modern (born 1983), English actress
- Helen Molesworth (born 1966), American contemporary art curator
- Helen Moloney (1926–2011), Irish stained glass artist
- Helen Molyneux, Welsh lawyer
- Helen Monkivitch, Australian medical administrator and religious sister
- Helen Monks (born 1992), English writer, actress and comedian
- Helen Monsch (1881–1959), American home economist
- Helen Montagu (1928–2004), Australian theatre producer
- Helen Day Montanari (1881–1955), American educator philanthropist
- Helen Barrett Montgomery (1861–1934), American social reformer, educator and writer
- Helen Montilla (born 1969), Spanish sailor
- Helen Watterson Moody (1860–1928), American journalist and essayist
- Helen Moore, multiple people
- Helen Morales (born 1969), American classicist
- Helen Morgan, several people
- Helen Morningstar (1891–1951), geologist and paleontologist
- Helen Moros (1967–2003), New Zealand long-distance runner
- Helen Morrison (born 1942), American psychiatrist
- Helen Balfour Morrison (1900–1984), American photographer
- Helen Morse (born 1947), Australian actress
- Helen Mort (born 1985), British poet and novelist
- Helen Morton (physician) (1834–1916), American physician
- Helen Morton (born 1949), Australian politician
- Helen Moses (1905–1985), American swimmer
- Helen Curtin Moskey (1931–2003), Irish-American poet
- Helen Moulder (born 1947), New Zealand actress
- Helen Mountfield (born 1967), British barrister
- Helen Mowery (1922–2008), American actress
- Helen Muir (1920–2005), British rheumatologist
- Helen Marguerite Muir-Wood (1895 or 1896–1968), British paleontologist
- Helen Messinger Murdoch (1862–1956), American photographer
- Helen Mulholland, master blender from Northern Ireland
- Helen Murray (born 1990), New Zealand ice hockey player
- Helen Murrell, Australian Chief Justice
- Helen Muspratt (1907–2001), British photographer
- Helen Mussallem (1915–2012), Canadian nurse
- Helen A. Myron (1905–1983), American costume designer
- Helen Naha (1922–1993), Native American artist
- Helen Nakimuli (1985–2026), Ugandan politician
- Helen Nelson Napaljarri, Australian artist
- Helen Nash, multiple people
- Helen Neal, first black graduate of West Texas State University
- Helen Neale-May, South African politician
- Helen Nearing (1904–1995), American writer
- Helen Swift Neilson (c. 1869–1945), American writer and art collector
- Helen Nelis-Naukas (born 1961), Estonian fencer and coach
- Helen Nelson, multiple people
- Helen Nethercutt (born 1952), American businesswoman
- Helen A. Neville, American psychologist
- Helen Neville (1946–2018), American psychologist and scholar
- Helen Newlove, Baroness Newlove (born 1961), British anti-violence campaigner
- Helen Nibouar (1921–2017), American cryptographer
- Helen Nichol, multiple people
- Helen Nicholson, multiple people
- Helen Nicoll (1937–2012), English children's book author
- Helen Nielsen (1918–2002), American writer
- Helen W. Nies (1925–1996), American judge
- Helen Nilsson (born 1970), Swedish footballer
- Helen Nishikawa (born 1946), Japanese TV presenter and actor
- Helen Nkwocha (born 1976), English football manager
- Helen Noble, British actress
- Helen Beatty Noland (c. 1907–1962), American politician
- Helen Nordquist (1932–2023), American baseball player
- Helen Norfolk (born 1981), New Zealand swimmer
- Helen Campbell Norman (1856–1913), British military nurse
- Helen Norris (1916–2013), American poet
- Helen F. North (1921–2012), American classical scholar
- Helen Peters Nosworthy (1851–1940), American spiritualist and medium
- Helen Novikov (born 1976), Estonian architect and Olympic luger
- Helen H. Nowlis (1913–1986), American psychologist
- Helen Ntoso (born 1958), Ghanaian politician
- Helen Nugent (born 1949), Australian company director
- Helen Nussey (1875–1965), British welfare worker and writer
- Helen O'Bannon (c. 1939–1988), American economist
- Helen O'Brien (1925–2005), British nightclub owner and spy
- Helen O'Clery (c. 1910–2006), Irish writer
- Helen O'Connell (1920–1993), American singer, actress, and hostess
- Helen O'Connell (urologist) (born 1962), Australian urologist
- Helen O'Donnell, Irish businesswomen
- Helen O'Hara (born 1955), British musician
- Helen Sophia O'Hara, Irish watercolor artist
- Helen O'Hara (journalist), Northern Irish film critic and journalist
- Helen O'Leary, Irish-American artist
- Helen O'Neill, several people
- Helen O'Rahilly, Irish television producer and executive
- Helen O'Toole, American painter
- Helen Odell-Miller, British music therapist
- Helen Ofurum, Nigerian writer
- Helen Ogger (1909–1983), American inker and cartoonist
- Helen Ogilvie (1902–1993), Australian artist
- Helen Ogston (1882–1973), Scottish suffragette
- Helen Ogunwumiju (born 1957), Nigerian judge
- Helen Olheim (c. 1904–1992), American mezzo-soprano opera singer
- Helen Oppenheimer (1926–2022), British theologian and academic
- Helen Betty Osborne (1952–1971), Canadian murder victim
- Helen Osborne (1939–2004), British journalist and critic
- Helen Matusevich Oujesky (1930–2010), American professor of microbiology
- Helen Ovbiagele (born 1944), Nigerian novelist
- Helen Owen (born 1980), English theatre actress
- Helen Brewster Owens (1881–1968), American mathematician
- Helen Oxenbury (born 1938), English illustrator and writer
- Helen Oyeyemi (born 1984), British novelist and playwright
- Helen Pai, American television writer, director, and producer
- Helen verDuin Palit, American social entrepreneur
- Helen Palmer, multiple people
- Helen Pankhurst, British activist and blogger
- Helen Z. Papanikolas (1917–2004), American novelist
- Helen Papashvily (1906–1996), American author
- Helen Paradeiser, Australian squash player
- Helen Rand Parish (1912–2005), American writer
- Helen Park (tennis) (born 1959), South Korean tennis player
- Helen Park (born 1986), American musical theatre composer
- Helen Parker, multiple people
- Helen Parkhurst (1887–1973), American educator, author and lecturer
- Helen Huss Parkhurst (1887–1973), American philosopher
- Helen Parrish (1923–1959), American actress
- Helen Parsons (1886–1977), American biochemist
- Helen Pashgian, American visual artist
- Helen Paul (born 1983), Nigerian comedian and actress
- Helen Pearse-Otene, New Zealand playwright, actor and author
- Helen Pearson (born 1959), British actress
- Helen Pedersen (1916–1998), American tennis player
- Helen Clay Pedersen, Danish women's rights activist
- Helen Peralta (born 1988), Dominican mixed martial artist
- Helen Percy, Duchess of Northumberland (1886–1965), English aristocrat and courtier
- Helen Perkin (1909–1996), English pianist and composer
- Helen Peters (born 1942), Canadian academic
- Helen Peterson (1915–2000), Native American activist and lobbyist
- Helén Pettersson (born 1972), Swedish politician
- Helen Watson Phelps, American painter
- Helen Phelps (died 1980), American murder victim
- Helen Philemon (born 1980), track and field athlete from Papua New Guinea
- Helen Phillips, several people
- Helen Pickett, American ballet choreographer
- Helen Pidd (born 1981), British journalist
- Helen D. Pigeon (1889–1945), American policewoman
- Helen Pitcher (born 1958), British lawyer
- Helen Pitt, Australian journalist
- Helen Pitts, multiple people
- Helen Plaschinski (born 1963), Mexican swimmer
- Helen Plimmer (born 1965), English cricketer
- Helen Pluckrose (born 1974), British writer and social culture
- Helen Plume, New Zealand climate change expert and senior
- Helen Jeanne Skewes Plummer (1891–1951), American paleontologist
- Helen Perlstein Pollard, American academic
- Helen Plane (1829–1925), American white supremacist
- Helen Polley (born 1957), Australian politician
- Helen Fogwill Porter (1930–2023), Canadian writer, educator and activist
- Helen Porter (1899–1987), British botanist
- Helen Portugal, American bridge player
- Helen Potrebenko (1940–2022), Canadian author and activist
- Helen Beatrix Potter (1866–1943), English author, illustrator and natural scientist
- Helen Pratt, U. S. Marine Corps general
- Helen Prejean (born 1939), American nun and advocate
- Helen Prest-Ajayi (born 1959), Nigerian lawyer, writer and beauty pageant titleholder
- Helen Dodson Prince (1905–2002), American astronomer
- Helen Prothero-Lewis (1853–1946), Welsh writer
- Helen Purcell, American county recorder
- Helen Cordelia Putnam (1857–1951), American public health researcher
- Helen Pyke (1905–1954), English pianist, teacher and composer
- Helen Pyne-Timothy, Jamaican feminist literary critic and academic
- Helen Quach (1940–2013), Vietnamese-born symphony conductor
- Helen Quigley, Irish social democratic and Labour Party politician
- Helen Quinn (born 1943), Australian-American physicist
- Helen Rabagliati (1851–1934), British philanthropist and activist
- Helen Rae, American outsider artist
- Helen Ramsaran (born 1943), American sculptor
- Helen Ramsay (born 1931), American singer and entertainer
- Helen Rankin, multiple people
- Helen Ranney (1920–2010), American physician
- Helen Rappaport, British author and former actress
- Helen R. Rathbun (1870–1944), American painter
- Helen Raymond (1878–1965), American actress
- Helen Raynor (born 1972), Welsh screenwriter and editor
- Helen Razer (born 1968), Australian radio broadcaster
- Helen Appleton Read (1887–1974), American art historian
- Helen Reddel, respiratory physician
- Helen Reddy (1941–2020), Australian-American singer-songwriter and actress
- Helen Redfield (1900–c. 1988), American geneticist
- Helen Reed, multiple people
- Helen Rees, South African doctor and founder of executive director
- Helen Reeves (born 1980), British slalom canoeist
- Helen Reichert (1901–2011), American talk show personality
- Helen Reid, several people
- Helen Reilly (1891–1962), American mystery writer
- Helen Renton (1931–2016), Scottish Air Force officer
- Helen Repa (1884–1938), Czech American Nurse
- Helen Resor, several people
- Helen Steiner Rice (1900–1981), American poet
- Helen Hinsdale Rich (1827–1915), American writer
- Helen Stern Richards (1917–1983), American theatre manager
- Helen Richardson, several people
- Helen Richey (1909–1947), American aviator
- Helen Richey (dancer), Australian dancer
- Helen Rickerby, New Zealand poet, writer, editor and publisher
- Helen Riehle (born 1950), American politician from Vermont
- Helen Caldwell Day Riley (1926–2013), Catholic author and hospitality house founder
- Helen Roberts, several people
- Helen Waimel Robertson, Canadian sculptor
- Helen Robertson (1848–1937), Scottish-born Australian tailor and trade unionist
- Helen Robinson, multiple people
- Helen Roche, British historian of modern European cultural history
- Helen C. Rockefeller, American composer
- Helen Rockel (born 1945), New Zealand painter
- Helen Rodd, Canadian zoologist
- Helen Roden (born 1986), former college basketballer and Australian rules footballer
- Helen M. Roe (1895–1988), Irish librarian and antiquary
- Helen Rogers, British singer/songwriter
- Helen Jean Rogers (1928–1998), American television producer
- Helen Rollason (1956–1999), British sports journalist and television presenter
- Helen Rose (1904–1985), American costume designer
- Helen Rosenthal (born 1960), American politician
- Helen Maria Roser (1903–1992), American nurse
- Helen Roseveare (1925–2016), English Christian missionary
- Helen Rosner, American food writer and editor
- Helen Rous (1863–1934), Irish actress
- Helen Rowland (actress) (1918–1978), American actress
- Helen Rowland (1876–1950), American journalist
- Helen Roy (born 1969), British ecologist and entomologist
- Helen Rule, British actress
- Helen Rushall (1914–1984), Scottish schoolteacher
- Helen Russell, multiple people
- Helen Russell-Clark, British actress
- Helen Woodford Ruth (1897–1929), first wife of Babe Ruth
- Helen Ryan (born 1938), British actress
- Helen Safa (1930–2013), anthropologist, feminist scholar and academic
- Helen Sahagian (1920–2013), Armenian historian
- Helen Saibil (born 1950), British molecular biologist
- Helen Sampson (1885–1976), British painter
- Helen Willa Samuels, American archivist and scholar
- Helen P. Sanborn (1858–1922), American educator and civic worker
- Helen Sanderson-White, British singer-songwriter, musician, artist and writer
- Helen Sandoz (1920–1987), American lesbian rights activist
- Helen Hooven Santmyer (1895–1986), American writer
- Helen F. Satterthwaite (born 1928), American politician
- Helen Roney Sattler (1921–1992), American children's author
- Helen Sauls-August, Speaker of the Eastern Cape Provincial Legislature
- Helen Saunders (1885–1963), English painter
- Helen Alton Sawyer, American painter
- Helen Scales, British marine biologist
- Helen Schamroth, New Zealand crafts artist and author
- Helen Maynor Scheirbeck (1935–2010), American educator and activist
- Helen Schelle (1893–1984), American businessperson
- Helen Schifano (1922–2007), American gymnast
- Helen Schlachtenhaufen (born 1995), American runner
- Helen B. Schleman (1902–1992), American university dean
- Helen Schlesinger, British actress
- Helen Schnabel (1911–1974), American pianist
- Helen Schneider (born 1952), American singer and actress
- Helen Bonchek Schneyer (1921–2005), American singer
- Helen Schou (1905–2006), Danish sculptor
- Helen Schucman (1909–1981), American clinical and research psychologist
- Helen Schulman (born 1961), American novelist
- Helen M. Schultz (1898–1974), American intercity bus entrepreneur
- Helen Macpherson Schutt (1874–1951), Australian philanthropist
- Helen Scott, multiple people
- Helen Scott-Orr, Australian veterinarian and epidemiologist
- Helen Seaborg (1917–2006), American child welfare advocate
- Helen Sear (born 1955), British artist
- Helen Searle (c. 1834–1884), American painter
- Helen McGaffey Searles (1856–1936), American professor, classicist, and women's suffragist
- Helen Sebidi (born 1943), South African artist
- Helen Sekaquaptewa, Native American and Mormon heroine
- Helen Earle Sellers (1903–1951), American writer and politician
- Helen Serafinowicz (born 1974), English writer and producer
- Helen Serger, 20th-century gallerist
- Helen Sewell (1896–1957), American illustrator and writer
- Helen Sexton (1862–1950), Australian surgeon
- Helen Sham-Ho (born 1943), Australian politician
- Helen Shapiro (born 1946), English singer
- Helen Shardey, Australian politician
- Helen Sharman (born 1963), British chemist and cosmonaut
- Helen Sharpe (1927–1996), English cricketer
- Helen Sharsmith (1905–1982), American botanist
- Helen Shaver (born 1951), Canadian actress and director
- Helen Shaw, several people
- Helen Sheldon (1859–1945), British headmistress and educationist
- Helen J. Shen (born 2000), American actress
- Helen Shenton, librarian and college archivist
- Helen Miller Shepard (1868–1938), American philanthropist
- Helen Parsons Shepherd (1923–2008), Canadian artist
- Helen Shields (died 1963), American actress
- Helen Shiller, Chicago politician
- Helen Shingler (1919–2019), British actress
- Helen Rulison Shipley (1870–1955), American dentist
- Helen Shipman (1899–1984), American actress
- Helen Shirk, American jewelry designer
- Helen Smith Shoemaker (1903–1993), American sculptor
- Helen Shupla, American artist
- Helen Sildna (born 1978), Estonian cultural entrepreneur
- Helen Silver, Australian public servant
- Helen Silvermaster (1899–1991), accused Soviet spy
- Helen Silving-Ryu (1906–1993), Austrian-American jurist and university teacher
- Helen Simonson, English novelist
- Helen Simpson, multiple people
- Helen Singleton (born 1932), American activist
- Helen Sioussat (1902–1995), American network executive
- Helen Sjöholm (born 1970), Swedish singer
- Helen Skelton (born 1983), English TV presenter
- Helen Skouteris, Australian academic
- Helen Slater (born 1963), American actress
- Helen Slatter (born 1970), British swimmer
- Helen Slayton-Hughes (1930–2022), American actress
- Helen Sloan, Irish photographer
- Helen Farr Sloan (1911–2005), American painter
- Helen Slottje, environmental activist
- Helen Small (born 1964), New Zealand academic
- Helen Sheldon Jacobs Smillie (1854–1926), American painter
- Helen Smith, multiple people
- Helen Wyatt Snapp (1918–2013), American aviator
- Helen Sneddon, British chemist
- Helen Martanie Snowden (1860–1925), American artist
- Helen Levitov Sobell (1918–2002), American poet
- Helen Sommers (1932–2017), American politician
- Helen Southworth (born 1956), British politician
- Helen Margaret Spanton (1877–1934), British artist and suffragette
- Helen Spencer-Oatey (born 1952), British linguist and psychologist
- Helen Spivey, American politician
- Helen Spurway (c. 1917–1978), British biologist
- Helen McRae Stace (1850–1926), New Zealand homemaker and school matron
- Helen Stadelbauer (1910–2006), Canadian artist
- Helen A. Stafford (1922–2011), American plant scientist
- Helen Stallman, Australian scientist
- Helen Camille Stanley (1930–2021), American composer, pianist and violist
- Helen Ekin Starrett (1840–1920), American educator, author, suffragette
- Helen Steel, environmental and social justice activist
- Helen Steele (born 1894, date of death unknown), American composer and pianist
- Helen Steinbinder (1923–2015), American law professor
- Helen Stenborg (1925–2011), American actress
- Helen Stephens (1918–1994), American athlete
- Helen Stern (1930–2019), American sculptor
- Helen Steven (1942–2016), Scottish pacifist
- Helen Norton Stevens (1869–1943), American journalist
- Helen Stevenson, several people
- Helen Steward (born 1965), British philosopher
- Helen Stewart, several people
- Helen Stickler (born 1966), American designer and filmmaker
- Helen R. Stobbe (1902–1982), American geologist and professor
- Helen Gerrells Stoddard (1850–1940), American temperance activist and politician
- Helen Stokes-Lampard (born 1970), British medical academic and general practitioner
- Helen Stone, British civil engineer
- Helen Storey (born 1959), British fashion designer
- Helen Storrow (1864–1944), American philanthropist
- Helen Stother (1955–2019), English cricketer
- Helen Stoumbos (born 1970), Canadian soccer player and television broadcaster
- Helen Stratton (1867–1961), British illustrator known for children's book
- Helen Stuart (1919–2016), American cabaret and torch singer
- Helen Thompson Sunday (1868–1957), American evangelist
- Helen Sung, American jazz pianist
- Helen Sutermeister (1943–1979), Canadian historian
- Helen Suzman (1917–2009), South African anti-apartheid activist and politician
- Helen Svedin (born 1976), Swedish model
- Helen Sword, New Zealand academic
- Helen Sworn, English Baptist missionary
- Helen Giri Syiem, Indian musicologist and historian
- Helen Chiarello Szabo (1923–2015), American politician
- Helen Szamuely (1950–2017), Soviet-born British Eurosceptic historian
- Helen Szoke (born 1954), Australian nonprofit executive
- Helen Szuty (born 1957), Australian politician
- Helen Herron Taft (1861–1943), First Lady of the United States
- Helen Tager-Flusberg, autism researcher
- Helen Tai, American politician
- Helen Talbot (1924–2010), American actress
- Helen Tam (born 1963), host of children's programmes in Hong Kong
- Helen Tamiris (1905–1966), American choreographer
- Helen Tanger (born 1978), Dutch rower
- Helen Hornbeck Tanner (1916–2011), American historian
- Helen Henrietta Tanzer, American classical philosopher
- Helen B. Taussig (1898–1986), American cardiologist
- Helen Taylor, several people
- Helen Damrosch Tee-Van (1893–1976), German-American illustrator
- Helen Terry (born 1956), British singer and television producer
- Helen Rand Thayer (1863–1935), American social reformer
- Helen Thayer (born 1927), New Zealand-born explorer
- Helen Thomas, multiple people
- Helen Thompson, multiple people
- Helen Thomson (politician) (born 1940), American politician
- Helen Thomson (actress), Australian actress
- Helena Thopia (fl. 1388–1403), Albanian princess
- Helen Thorington (1928–2023), American artist and writer
- Helen Thornycroft (1848–1937), British artist
- Helen Thorpe (athlete) (born 1963), British athlete
- Helen Thorpe (born 1963), American journalist
- Helen Tibbo, American archivist
- Helen Spitzer Tichauer (1918–2018), American graphics designer
- Helen Tiffin, Australian academic
- Helen Timperley, New Zealand professor
- Helen Tippett (1933–2004), Australian-New Zealand architecture academic
- Helen To (born 1975), Hong Kong television host
- Helen Tobias-Duesberg (1919–2010), Estonian-American composer
- Helen Bekele Tola (born 1994), Ethiopian-Swiss long-distance runner
- Helen Toner, Australian researcher, and the interim executive director
- Helen Torr (1886–1967), American Modernist painter
- Helen Townsend (born 1969), New Zealand netball player
- Helen Tracy (1850–1924), American actress
- Helen Tran, American chemist and academic
- Helen Tran (politician), American politician
- Helen Traubel (1899–1972), American opera singer
- Helen Tretbar (1835–1902), American author
- Helen Mabel Trevor (1831–1900), Northern Irish landscape and genre painter
- Helen Rodríguez Trías (1929–2001), American pediatrician and women's rights activist
- Helen Trinca, Australian journalist and author
- Helen Trix (1886–1951), American actress
- Helen Troke (born 1964), English badminton player
- Helen Tse, British author and restaurateur
- Helen Hale Tuck (1894–1957), American educator
- Helen Tucker, multiple people
- Helen Turley, American winemaker
- Helen Turner, multiple people
- Helen Twelvetrees (1908–1958), American actress
- Helen Ukaonu (born 1991), Nigerian footballer
- Helen Ukpabio, Nigerian Christian leader
- Helen Upperton (born 1979), Canadian bobsledder
- Helen Utegaard, American bridge player
- Helen Va'aga (born 1977), New Zealand rugby player and coach
- Helen Valentine, American magazine founder
- Helen van der Ben (born 1964), Dutch field hockey player
- Helen van Goozen (born 1980), Dutch speed skater
- Helen Van Vechten (1868–1949), American printer
- Helen Van Wyk (1930–c. 1994), American painter and television producer
- Helen Vanderburg (born 1959), Canadian synchronized swimmer
- Helen Vanderplank (1919–2005), South African biologist
- Helen Vanni (1924–2023), American opera singer
- Helen Varcoe (1907–1995), English swimmer
- Helen Vari (1931–2023), Canadian philanthropist
- Helen Guillette Vassallo, researcher and businesswoman
- Helen Vatsikopoulos (born 1960), Australian journalist, academic and documentary film–maker
- Helen Vela (1946–1992), Filipina actress, broadcaster and producer
- Helen Velando (born 1961), Uruguayan writer
- Helen Vendler (1933–2024), American poetry critic
- Helen Vernet (1875–1956), first woman in Great Britain to be granted a license as a bookmaker on a racecourse
- Helen Verran, Australian historian
- Helen Vincent, Viscountess D'Abernon (1866–1954), British noblewoman, socialite and diarist
- Helen Vinson (1907–1999), American actress
- Helen Vita (1928–2001), Swiss actress
- Helen Vlachos (1911–1995), Greek journalist
- Helen Volk (born 1954), Zimbabwean field hockey player
- Helen Vollam (born 1974), British musician
- Helen von Münchofen (1904–c. 1956), Danish actress
- Helen Waddell (1889–1965), Irish poet
- Helen Wadsworth (born 1964), Welsh professional golfer
- Helen Wagner (1918–2010), American actress
- Helen Bosart Morgan Wagstaff, American sculptor
- Helen Wainwright (1906–1965), American swimmer and diver
- Helen Walden, English structural biologist
- Helen Walker, several people
- Helen Wallis (1924–1995), British librarian and historian
- Helen Wallace (born 1946), British academic, historian and political scientist
- Helen Walsh, English novelist and film director
- Helen Walton (1919–2007), American philanthropist
- Helen Walulik (1929–2012), American baseball player
- Helen Wan (born 1973), American novelist and lawyer
- Helen Wang, English sinologist and translator
- Helen Ward, multiple people
- Helen Wardlaw (born 1982), English cricketer
- Helen Ware (1877–1939), American actress
- Helen Ware (violinist) (1887–1974), American violinist
- Helen Waterhouse (1913–1999), British archaeologist and classical scholar
- Helen Watson, multiple people
- Helen Watts (1927–2009), Welsh contralto
- Helen Kirkpatrick Watts (1881–1972), British suffragette
- Helen Weaver (1931–2021), American writer and translator
- Helen L. Webster (1853–1928), American philologist and educator
- Helen Worthing Webster (1837–1904), American physician
- Helen Weinzweig (1915–2010), Canadian writer
- Helen L. Weiss (1920–1948), American musical composer, pianist and choir director
- Helen Weiss, British epidemiologist
- Helen Wellings, Australian journalist and consumer advocate
- Helen Wellington-Lloyd (born 1954), British actress
- Helen Wells (c. 1910–1986), American novelist
- Helen Searles Westbrook (1889–1967), American musician
- Helen Westcott (1928–1998), American actress
- Helen Westerman (1926–2006), American baseball player
- Helen Westley (1875–1942), American actress
- Helen Weston, Welsh netball player
- Helen Westwood, Australian politician
- Helen Whately (born 1976), British politician
- Helen Wheels (1949–2000), American singer and songwriter
- Helen Whelton, Irish epidemiologist
- Helen Whitaker (1890–1929), English Girl Guide leader
- Helen White, multiple people
- Helen Riaboff Whiteley, American microbiologist
- Helen Whitener (born 1964), American judge
- Helen Hay Whitney (1875–1944), American poet
- Helen Whitney, American producer, director and writer
- Helen Whitwell (1955–2024), British forensic pathologist
- Helen Augusta Whittier (1846–1925), American editor, lecturer, teacher, clubwoman, businesswoman
- Helen Wiggins, British film editor
- Helen Wilcox (born 1955), British literary scholar
- Helen Mary Wilkes, Scottish-Irish sailing sportswoman
- Helen Wilkes (1927–2015), American businesswoman
- Helen S. Willard (1894–1980), American occupational therapist and college professor
- Helen Willetts (born 1972), British meteorologist and badminton player
- Helen Williams, multiple people
- Helen Wills (1905–1998), American tennis player
- Helen Wilson, multiple people
- Helen Wily (1921–2009), New Zealand statistician and mathematician
- Helen Wing (died 1981), American author, composer and pianist
- Helen Winkelmann, New Zealand judge
- Helen M. Winslow (1851–1938), American author, journalist
- Helen Wise (born 1928), American politician
- Helen Wodehouse (1880–1964), British philosopher
- Helen Chan Wolf, artificial intelligence pioneer
- Helen Wolff (1906–1994), American editor and publisher
- Helen Wood, multiple people
- Helen Sumner Woodbury (1876–1933), American economist, academic, historian and public official
- Helen Woodhouse (born 1953), British sprinter canoer
- Helen Woodruff, multiple people
- Helen Woods, multiple people
- Helen Thompson Woolley (1874–1947), American psychologist
- Helen Worboys, New Zealand politician
- Helen Worland (born 1950), Australian tennis player
- Helen Worth (born 1951), English actress
- Helen Lee Worthing (1905–1948), American actress
- Helen Wright, multiple people
- Helen Yarmak (born 1949), Russian fashion designer
- Helen Yate (1921–2020), British swimmer
- Helen Yawson (born 1967), Ghanaian gospel singer
- Helen Yglesias (1915–2008), American novelist
- Helen Young, multiple people
- Helen Zahavi, English novelist and screenwriter
- Helen Zaltzman, English podcaster, broadcaster and writer
- Helen Zelezny-Scholz (1882–1974), Czech-born sculptor and architectural sculptor
- Helen Zelkowitz (1911–2006), American broadcaster
- Helen D. Zepp (1903–1994), American medical researcher
- Helen Zerefos (born 1937), Australian coloratura soprano
- Helen Zia, Chinese-American journalist
- Helen Zille (born 1951), South African politician
- Helen Zimmern (1846–1934), British naturalized writer and translator
- Helen Zout, Argentine photographer
- Helen Zughaib (born 1959), American painter

== See also ==
- Eilidh
- Eleanor
- Ellen (given name)
- Helen (disambiguation)
- Helin (surname)
