= Helen Levine =

Canadian feminist and activist (1923–2018)

Helen Levine (née Zivian, 15 October 1923 – 24 October 2018) was a Canadian feminist and activist known for introducing feminist curricula into Canadian social work education. She taught in Ottawa, Ontario, at Carleton University's School of Social Work, from 1972 to 1988, where she introduced radical feminism into the school's structural approach to social work. Levine was recognized for her achievement in advancing the status of women: she was awarded Canada's Governor General's Award in Commemoration of the Persons Case, in 1989.

== Biography ==
Levine was born to Rebecca (née Yaffe) Zivian and Isaac Zivian, in Ottawa, Ontario. She attended Queen's University before graduating from the University of Toronto School of Social Work. In Toronto she met union organizer, Gilbert Levine (1924–2009), and the two were married in 1947, before conceiving two children: Ruthie Tamara Levine and Karen Levine.

Levine initially worked as a homemaker, and also worked part-time for the Ottawa branch of the Children's Aid Society She was featured in the Studio D documentary, Motherland: Tales of Wonder, where she expressed her frustration at social pressures placed on traditional stay-at-home mothers: "I couldn't be the hand maiden. I couldn't be the assistant … I couldn't go back to pretending that my own existence didn't matter." Her resulting depression led to her hospitalization, in 1970: an experience which informed her subsequent writings, especially her theories on women and mental illness.

Helen Levine became a faculty member at Carleton University's School of Social Work, in 1972, during the second-wave feminism period. Levine practiced feminist counselling and volunteered for nonprofit organizations that advocated for women's rights. After her retirement, Levine continued advocating for women's rights. She founded a group for older women, 'The Crones,' and volunteered for the Older Women's League (OWL). Levine helped establish Ottawa's Internal House: the city's first shelter for women who had suffered domestic violence. In 1998, she was awarded the YWCA Ottawa Woman of Distinction Lifetime Achievement Award.

Levine died in Ottawa, Ontario, at age 95, by medically assisted death. In 2019 her personal records were donated to the University of Ottawa Archives and Special Collections.

== Career at the School of Social Work ==
In the early 1970s, the School of Social Work at Carleton University had adopted the radical structural approach to teaching social work: one that examined the exploitative nature of establishments and social institutions. The approach was critical of how institutions, such as patriarchy, created inequities. Helen Levine's advocacy work and radical feminism integrated with the school's approach to social work education.

Levine taught feminist courses and women's studies courses, such as: "Status of Women," "Women and Welfare," and also "Feminist Counselling." Many of her publications focussed on how women's experiences and treatment within the mental health system were determined by gender role and social expectation. She critiqued the conventional helping professions, proposing the adoption of feminist perspectives as an alternative approach to social intervention with women.

According to Maritime School of Social Work Professor Joan Gilroy, "what Helen did was to change the focus so that social workers began to look at the phenomena–wife battering, incest, rape, sexual abuse–and began to analyze the social fabric from this broader perspective, from a perspective of social inequality." She was awarded the Bessie Touzel Award in 1993, by the Ontario Association of Professional Social Workers.

== Publications ==
- Between Friends: A Year in Letters by Berry Oonagh and Helen Levine (2005)
- "Fanning Fires: Women's Studies in a School of Social Work" in Minds of Our Own: Inventing Feminist Scholarship and Women's Studies in Canada and Québec, 1966-76 (2008)
- "Feminist Counselling: A look at New Possibilities" in the Special Issue of Social Worker (1976)
- "Feminist Counseling: A Woman-Centered Approach" in Women, Work and Wellness (1989)
- "On Women and On One Woman" in Women: Their Use of Alcohol and Other Legal Drugs (1976)
- "The Personal Is Political: Feminism and the Helping Professions" in Feminism in Canada: From Pressure to Politics (1982)
- The Power Politics of Motherhood: A Feminist Critique of Theory and Practice by Alma Estable and Helen Levine (1981)

== Awards ==
- In October 1989, Levine was one of six women across Canada to receive the Governor General's Person's Award, in recognition of her contribution to improving the status of Canadian women.
- Levine was awarded the Bessie Touzel Award, in 1993, for lifelong achievement in the field of social work as recognized by the Ontario Association of Social Workers (OASW).
- In 1998, Helen Levine was awarded the Ottawa YWCA Ottawa Woman of Distinction Lifetime Achievement Award, celebrating trailblazing women who have excelled in their fields and supported the advancement of women.

== Other information ==
- Helen Levine's archives are held at the University of Ottawa, Archives and Special Collections.
