= Helen Holmes =

Helen Holmes may refer to:

- Helen Freudenberger Holmes, American journalist, teacher, politician, historian, and Army veteran
- Helen Holmes (actress) (1892–1950)
