= Helen French =

Helen French may refer to:

- Helen M. French (1832–1909), American educator.
- Helen French (architect) (1900–1994), American architect.
