= Helen Makhuba =

South African politician

Helen Nonhlanhla Makhuba MP is a South African politician and a member of the Inkatha Freedom Party (IFP). She lives in Soweto and she was elected to Parliament in 2009.

== Life ==
She lives in Soweto and she was elected in 2009 to parliament for the Inkatha Freedom Party.

On June 26, 2009, she voiced the IFP's support for the budget of the Department of Home Affairs but warned both it and the Independent Electoral Commission against disregarding either their prior flunks or their duties in the years ahead. The 2010 FIFA World Cup, she indicated, would place a peculiar stress on the Department.

Following the opposition victory in Johannesburg in the 2016 South African municipal election, the IFP joined the new coalition government in the city, led by the Democratic Alliance (DA), and Makhuba was appointed mayoral committee member of transport under Mayor Herman Mashaba.

She was not elected in 2014.
