= Helen Hakena =

Papua New Guinean activist

Helen Samu Hakena (née Gogohe, born 13 September 1955) is an organiser and campaigner for peace and women's rights from Bougainville, Papua New Guinea. In 1992 she co-founded the Leitana Nehan Women's Development Agency to help restore peace to the island. The organisation contributes humanitarian assistance, provides education programs on peace, gender issues and community development, and advocates for women's and children's rights. In 2000 the agency's work was recognised with a United Nations’ Millennium Peace Prize, and a Pacific Peace Prize in 2004.

After peace was declared, Hakena lobbied to have women involved in the constitutional development and disarmament processes with little success; only three women were included in the Bougainville Constitutional Commission and no women were involved in the weapons disposal programme.

Hakena is also a member of the Asia Pacific Forum on Women, Law and Development.

== Publications ==
- NGOs and Post-Conflict Recovery: The Leitana Nehan Women’s Development Agency, Bougainville, co-edited with Peter Ninnes and Bert Jenkins (2006), ANU Press
