= Helen Ofurum =

Nigerian writer (born 1941)

Helen Ofurum (born 1941) is a Scottish-born Nigerian author of children's English-language books. She was born to a British mother and is listed among the authors of the Oxford Encyclopedia of Children's Literature.

== Selected works ==
- Iheoma Comes To Stay (1982)
- A Welcome for Chijioke (1983)
