= Helen Kelly =

Helen Kelly may refer to:

- Helen Kelly (trade unionist) (1964–2016), President of the New Zealand Council of Trade Unions
- Helen Kelly (cyclist) (born 1971), track and road cyclist from Australia
- Helen Margaret Kelly (1884–1952), philanthropist
- Helen Kelly (badminton) (born c.1950), Scottish badminton player
