= Helen Gordon =

Helen Gordon may refer to:

- Elenor Gordon (Helen Orr Gordon, 1934–2014), Scottish swimmer
- Helen Gordon (CEO), chief executive designate of Grainger plc
- Helen Gordon (bowls), Israeli lawn bowler
- Helen Gordon Davis (1926–2015), American actress and politician from Florida
