= Helen Nichol =

Helen Nichol or Nicol may refer to:

- Helen Nichol (badminton) (born 1981), Canadian badminton player
- Helen Nicol (1920–2021), Canadian baseball pitcher
- Phyllis Fraser (1916–2006), American actress, journalist, and children's book publisher, born Helen Brown Nichols
- Helen Nicol (suffragist) (1854–1932), New Zealand temperance and suffrage activist
