= Helen Simpson =

Helen Simpson may refer to:

- Helen Simpson (lecturer) (1890–1960), New Zealand teacher, university lecturer and writer
- Helen de Guerry Simpson (1897–1940), Australian novelist
- Helen Simpson (author) (born 1957), British short story writer
