= Helen White =

Helen White may refer to:

- Helen Magill White (1853–1944), first US woman to earn a Ph.D.
- Helen C. White (1896–1967), English professor
- Helen White (politician), New Zealand politician

== See also ==
- Helene Raskin White (born 1949), professor of sociology at the Center for Alcohol Studies at Rutgers University
