= Helen Rankin =

Helen Rankin may refer to:

- Helen Rankin (Ohio politician) (1936–2026), member of the Ohio House of Representatives
- Helen Rankin (Maine politician) (1931–2022), member of the Maine House of Representatives
