= Helen Gee =

Helen Gee might refer to:

- Helen Gee (curator)
- Helen Gee (environmentalist)
