= Helen Roberts (disambiguation) =

Helen Roberts (1912–2010) was an English soprano singer.

Helen Roberts may also refer to:

- Helen Heffron Roberts (1888–1985), American anthropologist and ethnomusicologist
- Helen M. Roberts (1896–1983), American writer, photographer, and multilingual educator
