= Helen Fox (disambiguation) =

Helen Fox (born 1962) is an English children's author.

Helen Fox may also refer to:

- Helen Morgenthau Fox (1884–1974), American botanist
- Helen Fox, married name of Helen Nicol (1920–2021), Canadian former baseball pitcher
- Helen the Baby Fox, 2006 Japanese film
