= Helen Sanderson-White =

British singer-songwriter, musician, artist and writer

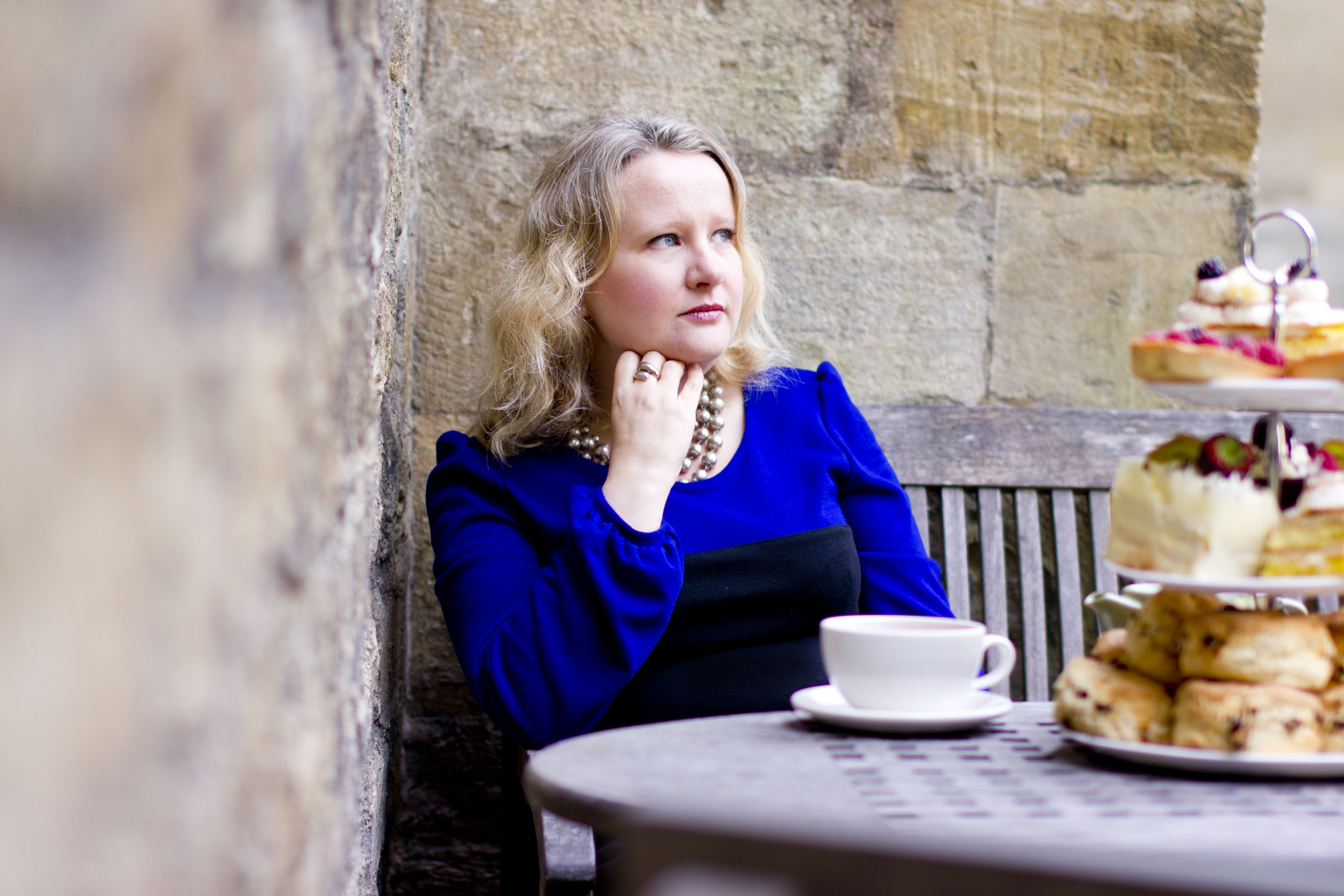
Sirens and Other Myths

Helen Sanderson-White (born 1977) is a British singer-songwriter, musician, artist and writer based in Buckinghamshire. A singer and pianist, she has worked in most genres including pop, folk, classical and Contemporary Christian Music, however she is most known for her secular pop, soul and jazz work.

== Music career ==
The daughter of a Baptist minister and a nurse, Sanderson-White's music career began at an early age in church. Her first singing performance was when she was three years old and by the time she was five, she was learning to play the piano. She began writing in her teens and to date has released five studio projects. She has collaborated with artists from a variety of genres including Liquidscreamer, Nikki Noodles and more recently with the folk singer Darren Hayman. Sanderson-White spent a large amount of her childhood performing on local circuits in Kent and Devon and honed her craft as a solo performer.

=== Early work ===
Her first album Conversations With The Heart was released in June 2004 on an independent label, Houndsville. This then led to her second album Fallen But Not Fatal (2006).

In 2007, Sanderson-White was challenged by a friend who is a priest to create a contemporary setting of the Latin Mass which he could use with his young people. Out of this The Sanctus Project (2010) was born and to date this is used around the world.

=== Resound Media ===
Between 2010 and 2015, she worked with Resound Media and released two EPs, the first being At Second Glance. From this EP, she had a number one hit with "Do You Seek An Answer" which was number one across the UK and Europe in the New Christian Music charts. This was quickly followed by "Surrounded By Love" which reached number four in the Christian Hot disc chart.

In 2011, Sanderson-White won the UK Christian Music Award for "NCM Contemporary Artist (England)" which was presented to her by George Hamilton IV.

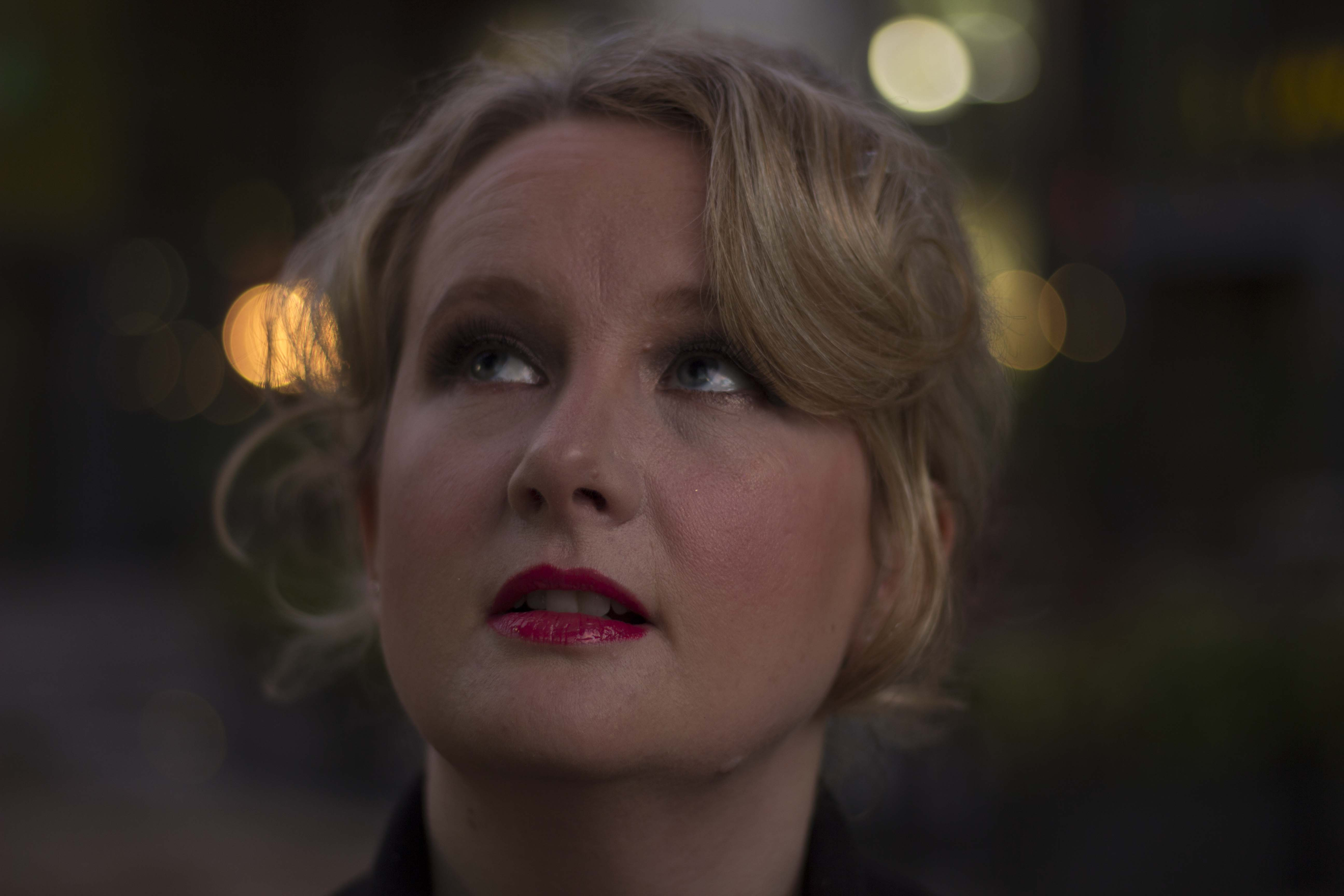

Sirens and Other Mysteries was released in 2013. Unlike her previous records, this EP was solely based around her acoustic piano and vocal work, and was released in to showcase the sound of her live shows. The EP reached number six in the Louder Than The Music 2013 awards. This EP was supported by a Kickstarter campaign to raise funds for a music video for "If That's The Way".

Her final recording with Resound Media was the uptempo single, "Close That Door", which was released in January 2016.

=== 2017 - present ===
From 2017, Sanderson-White decided to continue working on demos and throughout the year released songs from The Sketchbook: The Demos.

As part of the First World War commemorations in 2018, Helen wrote two songs that were commissioned by the Buckinghamshire Archive, All For Love and Are You Coming Home?. These songs formed part of local collection of war stories represented through various art forms.

In 2019 Helen collaborated with The English Jazz Orchestra, and debuted a collection of jazz versions of her songs arranged by Rachael Forsyth.

== Writing ==
Helen is also known for her writing, in particular her blogs on being artist and also looking at aspects of Christian faith, prophecy and the supernatural lifestyle.

Helen and Rachael Forsyth published a book The Resilient Artist based on a number of blogs they had written on cultivating and maintaining a creative lifestyle during difficult seasons of life.

== Discography ==
Year	Albums
2004	Conversations With The Heart
2006	Fallen But Not Fatal
2010	The Sanctus Project

Year	EPs
2011	At Second Glance
2013	Sirens And Other Mysteries
2017	Sketchbook: The Demos

Year	Singles
2006	Jealousy (with Liquidscreamer)
2006	Ali's Song (with Liquidscreamer)
2010	Hallelujah (solo work)
2011	Do Seek An Answer (solo work)
2011	Surrounded By Love (solo work)
2012	Insane (with Nikki Noodles)
2013	(I Need) A Hallelujah (with Nikki Noodles)
2015	Change The Record (with Nikki Noodles)
2016	Close That Door (solo work)
2017	What Am I Meant To Do With This Love? (solo work)
2017	Twenty Eight Days (solo work)
2018	Are You Coming Home? (solo work)
2018	All For Love (solo work)
2019	Tall Trees (solo work)
2019	You're So Hard On Me (solo work)
2020	Tomorrow's Brighter (solo work)
2021	Where Are You God? (solo work)
2021	WOMANKIND (solo work - instrumental)
2021	Starting Over Again (solo work)
2022	I Won't Rush You (solo work)
2022	Everything She Wants (solo work)
2025	Thaw (solo work - instrumental)

Year	Song arrangements for other artists
2022	A Homely Blessing (for Ruth Carlyle)
2025	Walking to the Beat of My Heart (for Ruth Carlyle)
