= Helen L. Cannon =

American geologist

Helen Leighton Cannon (April 29, 1911 – October 20, 1996) was an American geologist specifying in geobotany and studying the effects of geological chemicals on the environment. She was a woman in science making large contributions to geology and advancements for women in science. She had a long lasting career at the United States Geological Survey in Washington, D.C., and Denver, Colorado, soon becoming well known for her research and important discoveries. Cannon, along with two colleagues at USGS, set up and participated in the first organized unit studying chemicals in the real environment. The team concluded that by analyzing plants in a given area they could determine what metals were present in the soil and earth in that same area. In 1952, Cannon published a paper based on the findings and this paved the way for more research in geology and plants, geobotany. This research developed further into an important association with health issues, including cancer, as well as aided the United States to find uranium deposits during the Cold War. As an author, she has been largely collected by libraries.

== Early life and education ==
Helen L. Cannon was born in Wilkinsburg, Pennsylvania, on April 29, 1911. As a young child, she was encouraged by her father to observe the biodiversity along the Pennsylvanian countryside. This fostered her love for science and life. Cannon enrolled in Cornell University for a degree in applied sciences, graduating in 1932. She remained involved in academics, participating in postgraduate work at Northwestern University before enrolling for a Master's of Science degree from Pittsburgh University. Cannon received her M.S. in geology in 1934 and continued research in academics before joining a staff of geologists working for the Gulf Oil Company in 1935.

== Career ==
In 1932, once Cannon finished her degree in applied science at Cornell University, New York, she continued to further her education by attending other Universities for post graduate work in geology until 1935. She then got her first job in Saginaw, Michigan, at Gulf Oil Company. After spending three years with this company Cannon moved again, first to Washington, D.C., then to Denver, Colorado. There she set roots and began her career of more than 40 years at the U.S. Geological Survey. Cannon was the third woman to work for the company and dedicated her entire career to doing research for them. With this company, Cannon formed the first geochemical exploration with colleagues Lyman Huff and Herb Hawkes.

== Contributions to geography and geology ==
During her career as a scientist, Cannon focused on geobotany and the effects of metals on vegetation. Cannon worked on many pieces in these subjects. One of her works was on the method of using indicator plants to determine where uranium deposits might be. Hardier indicator plants that could withstand being in an environment with uranium were used to find out which locations were more likely to contain uranium in the ground. Uranium in an area could also be determined by looking at the chemical make up of certain plants to try to detect certain elements. This helped find new locations of uranium, specifically focusing on the Colorado Plateau. This was done using an indicator plant known as Astragalus pattersoni, which requires trace amounts of selenium to grow. Selenium was an element commonly found in uranium ore deposits making it easy to spot uranium from above ground. Cannon also contributed to geological patterns found in the areas she studied. Her 1952 journal focused on uranium and vanadium and the effects these metals had on the vegetation in the area. This introduced geobotany to the scientific stage.

== Death ==
Cannon died on October 20, 1996, at the age of 85 in her Santa Fe, New Mexico, home.

== Awards and honors ==
Cannon has received numerous awards and honors in her lifetime, including becoming the first woman in an all men's science group to have a membership. This group was known as American Men in Science and was an important event that other American women and men respected. Cannon also attained memberships in Geological Society of America, Geology and Public Policy Committee, American Association for the Advancement of Science, Association of Exploration Geochemists and the Society of Environmental Geochemistry. In 1970 the Department of the Interior awarded Cannon the Meritorious Service award and five years later she received the topmost award known as the Distinguished Service Award from her continuous work at the Department of the Interior. With Cannon's discoveries relating trace elements affecting health, she became associated with the National Research Council and was given subcommittee chair on the Geochemical Environment in Relation to Health and Disease.

== Selected list of works ==
U.S. Geological Survey

- Cannon, Helen L. (1957). "Description of indicator plants and methods of botanical prospecting for uranium deposits on the Colorado Plateau". U.S. Geological Survey Bulletin. 1030-M. 399–516.
- Cannon, Helen L. (1960). "The development of botanical methods of prospecting for uranium on the Colorado Plateau". U.S. Geological Survey Bulletin. 1085-A. 1-50.
