= Helen Ma =

Helen Ma can refer to:

- Helen Ma (actress)
- Helen Ma (skater)
