= Helen Dannetun =

Swedish professor (born 1957)

- Born: 1957 (age 68–69)
- Education: Linköping University (M.S.)
- Occupation: Professor
- Known for: Leading technical advisor to the Swedish Ministry of Education and was a member of the governing board of the Swedish Foundation for Strategic Research (2010-2011) and of the Swedish Technology Delegation (Teknikdelegationen) 2008–2010

Helen Dannetun (born 1957) is a Swedish professor of physics and rector of Linköping University.

In 1980 Helen Dannetun received a Master of Science in Applied Physics and Electrical Engineering at Linköping University, Sweden, and in 1987 a doctoral degree in applied physics. In 1996, she became an associate professor and in 1994 a senior lecturer. In 2002, she was appointed as a professor of physics at Linköping University.

She was Head of the Department of Physics, Chemistry and Biology (IFM) 2000 -2003, and Dean of the Institute of Technology 2004–2011. In June 2011 she was appointed rector of Linköping University, a post that she retained until 30 June 2020.

Helen Dannetun serves as a leading technical advisor to the Swedish Ministry of Education and was a member of the governing board of the Swedish Foundation for Strategic Research 2010-2011 and of the Swedish Technology Delegation (Teknikdelegationen) 2008–2010.
