= Helen Humes Lamale =

American labor statistician

- Born: Helen Humes; April 6, 1912
- Died: July 2, 1998 (aged 86)
- Known for: Fellow of the American Statistical Association

Helen Humes Lamale (April 6, 1912 – July 2, 1998) was an American labor statistician who worked for 30 years in the Bureau of Labor Statistics, retiring as Chief of the Division of Living Conditions Studies in 1972.

== Contributions ==
Some of Lamale's earliest work with the Bureau of Labor Statistics (published under the name Helen Humes) studied the effect of World War II on housing. Her later work documented a general increase in the standard of living for working-class families through the economic boom of the 1950s.

Her book Methodology of the Survey of Consumer Expenditures in 1950, Study of Consumer Expenditures, Incomes and Savings in the United States (published by the Wharton School of the University of Pennsylvania in 1959) became "the most complete account put into print of the design and procedures" of the 1950 Survey of Consumer Expenditures, carried out jointly by the Bureau of Labor Statistics and the Wharton School.

== Recognition ==
In 1966, Lamale was elected as a Fellow of the American Statistical Association "for significant contributions to the design and execution of consumer expenditure surveys and standard budget studies and to the analysis of levels and standards of living."
