= Helen Armstrong =

Helen Armstrong may refer to:

- Helen Armstrong (activist) (1875–1947), Canadian labour leader
- Helen Armstrong (violinist) (1943–2006), American violinist
- Helen Maitland Armstrong (1869–1948), American stained glass artist
- Nellie Melba (1861–1931), Australian opera soprano, married name Helen Armstrong
