= Helen Burgess (scientist) =

Canadian conservation scientist

Helen Diana Burgess
- Born: July 28, 1951; Lethbridge, Alberta, Canada
- Died: August 24, 1999 (aged 48); Ottawa, Ontario, Canada
- Education: University of Lethbridge; University of British Columbia; Queen's University
- Known for: artifact conservation
- Scientific career
- Fields: Organic chemistry, conservation-restoration
- Workplaces: Canadian Conservation Institute

Helen Diana Burgess (28 July 1951 – 24 August 1999), was a Canadian conservation scientist. Burgess spent her career at the Canadian Conservation Institute ("CCI"), where she was a Senior Conservation Scientist. She was a researcher in paper and textiles conservation processes and an expert in the areas of cellulose degradation analysis, conservation bleaching, washing, enzyme applications on paper, as well as aqueous and mass deacidification of paper.

== Career ==
Helen Burgess obtained her Bachelor of Science (Chemistry) (Honours) from the University of Lethbridge in 1973. Burgess subsequently went to the University of British Columbia, where she graduated with a Masters of Science in bio-organic chemistry. She then went on to obtain a Masters of Conservation from Queen's University, specializing in conservation science. At Queen's, her Masters thesis dealt with the degradation of cellulose during conservation bleaching treatments.

In 1978, Burgess joined CCI in its Conservation Processes Research department. Burgess ultimately became its Senior Conservation Scientist, a position she held until her retirement in 1998. Her primary focus was the conservation of paper artifacts, but she also handled other materials, such as textiles. For several decades, the primary guidance for conservation bleaching practices was dominated by guidelines Burgess helped develop. Burgess was the first conservation-restoration scientist to classify the chemical analysis of treated specimens, and to find an application for bleaching agents in paper conservation. Burgess published numerous articles in a variety of academic journals and industry publications. Burgess was also a frequent presenter at conservation, restoration, and scientific conferences. She was one of the scientists featured on a 1990 episode of The Nature of Things, "Turning to Dust", about the deterioration of paper in old books around the world and efforts to preserve them.

Burgess died a year after her retirement, in 1999. At the annual conference of the Western Association for Art Conservation following her death, several of the presentations were dedicated to her memory.
