= Helen Fields =

English writer

- Born: Helen Sarah Fields; 1969 (age 56–57)
- Occupation: Writer
- Children: 3
- Writing career
- Language: English
- Website: www.helenfields.com

Helen Sarah Fields (born 1969) is an English novelist and short story writer, who writes primarily in the crime fiction and thriller genres.

== Personal life ==
Fields is originally from Romsey, but moved to North Waltham in the early 2000s.

She is a former criminal and family law barrister who practiced criminal and family law cases for 13 years. She has three children. In 2017, she and her family moved to Southern California in the United States, and by 2022 had relocated back to England.

== Writing career ==
Fields is a million-copy best-selling crime writer who has also written under the pen name HS Chandler. She is a member of the Society of Authors' board of directors. Her books have been translated into Belgian, Chinese, Czech, Dutch, Finnish, French, German, Hungarian, Italian, Macedonian, Norwegian, Polish, Portuguese, Russian, Slovak, Spanish, Swedish, Lithuanian and Taiwanese.

Fields began writing and self-publishing in the early 2000s, but considered it largely a hobby. She later found an agent and released her debut novel, Perfect Remains, in 2017 through HarperCollins.

She has had articles published in magazines such as The Express Newspaper, The Telegraph, Country Life, Harper's Bazaar, and My Weekly.

== Books ==
- One for Sorrow (2022) ISBN 978-0008379339
- The Last Girl to Die (2022) ISBN 978-0008379360
- These Lost & Broken Things
- Perfect Kill ISBN 978-0008275242
- Degrees of Guilt (writing as HS Chandler) ISBN 978-1409178217
- Perfect Remains (2017, HarperCollins) ISBN 978-0008181550
- Perfect Prey ISBN 978-0008181581
- Perfect Death ISBN 978-0008181611
- Perfect Silence (2018) ISBN 978-0008275174
- Perfect Crime ISBN 978-0008275204
- The Shadow Man ISBN 978-0008379308
- The Institution ISBN 978-0008533519
- Profile K
- The Profiler ISBN 978-0008533564
- These Lost & Broken Things ISBN 978-0957124653

== Short stories ==
- "Let the Shadows Fall" (an anthology 'Scotland's Stories')
- "Midsummer Mysteries" (anthology short story) ISBN 978-1804177266
- "Death Comes at Christmas" (anthology short story) ISBN 978-1803369426
