= Helen Heney =

Australian historian

Helen Heney (1907 - 26 August 1990) was an Australian author. She was educated at the University of Sydney and lived in Poland from 1929 to 1935. She wrote fiction, social commentary and translation.

== Writings ==
=== Novels ===
- The Chinese Camellia (1950)
- The Proud Lady (1951)
- Dark Moon (1953)
- The Quiet Dust (1956)
- The Leaping Blaze (1962)

=== Non fiction ===
- Australia's Founding Mothers (1978)
- Dear Fanny : women's letters to and from New South Wales, 1788-1857 - editor
