= Helen Javorski =

American politician (1909–2008)

Member of the Connecticut House of Representatives from Enfield
- In office 1957–1959 Serving with Peter A. Crombie
- Preceded by: Charles H. Kegley; Stanley Yesukiewicz
- Succeeded by: Peter A. Crombie; Stanley Bigos

Personal details
- Born: May 10, 1909 Hazardville, Connecticut, U.S.
- Died: April 20, 2008 (aged 98) Bradenton, Florida, U.S.
- Party: Democratic
- Spouse: Stanley Javorski
- Children: 2

Helen Javorski (May 10, 1909 – April 20, 2008) was an American politician who served in the Connecticut House of Representatives from 1957 to 1959, representing the town of Enfield as a Democrat.

== Personal life ==
Javorski was born on May 10, 1909, in Hazardville, Connecticut, to John and Katherine Mulak. She was one of 11 siblings. She married Stanley Javorski, and they operated a dry goods store for 33 years before retiring to Bradenton, Florida, in 1976. They had two children together.

== Political career ==
A Democrat, Javorski was elected to the Connecticut House of Representatives in 1956, and she served one term representing the town of Enfield alongside fellow Democrat Peter A. Crombie. Javorski ran for reelection in 1958, but was defeated for the Democratic nomination by Crombie and Stanley Bigos.

== Death ==
Javorski died on April 20, 2008, in Bradenton, Florida. She was 98.
