= Helen Bronte-Stewart =

Neuroscientist

Helen M. Bronte-Stewart is a neurologist and John E Cahill Family Professor in the department of neurology and neurological Sciences at Stanford University School of Medicine. She is also the former director of the Stanford Movement Disorders Center.

== Education and career ==
She studied mathematics and physics at the University of York before earning a master's degree in bioengineering from the University of Pennsylvania. She then obtained a medical degree from the Perelman School of Medicine. She was promoted to an associate professorship in December 2006. Bronte-Stewart later held the John E. Cahill Family Professorship, first held by William C. Mobley. Her research focuses on the pathophysiology of Parkinson's Disease and other movement disorders.

== Personal life ==
Bronte-Stewart is a former professional dancer.
