= Helen MacDonald =

Helen MacDonald may refer to:

- Helen MacDonald (Prince Edward Island politician) (born 1947), member of the Prince Edward Island Legislative Assembly, 2000–2007
- Helen MacDonald of Glenaladale (died ca 1803), estate manager on Prince Edward Island
- Helen MacDonald (Nova Scotia politician), Canadian politician, former leader of the New Democrats
- Helen Macdonald (writer), British author, winner of 2014 Costa Book Awards
