= Helen Davies =

Helen Davies may refer to:

- Helen Davies (cricketer) (born 1966), South African cricketer
- Helen Davies (runner) (born 1979), British distance runner
- Helen Davies (harpist) (born 1950), British musician and player with Pádraigín Ní Uallacháin
