= Helen Croydon =

British author, broadcaster and journalist

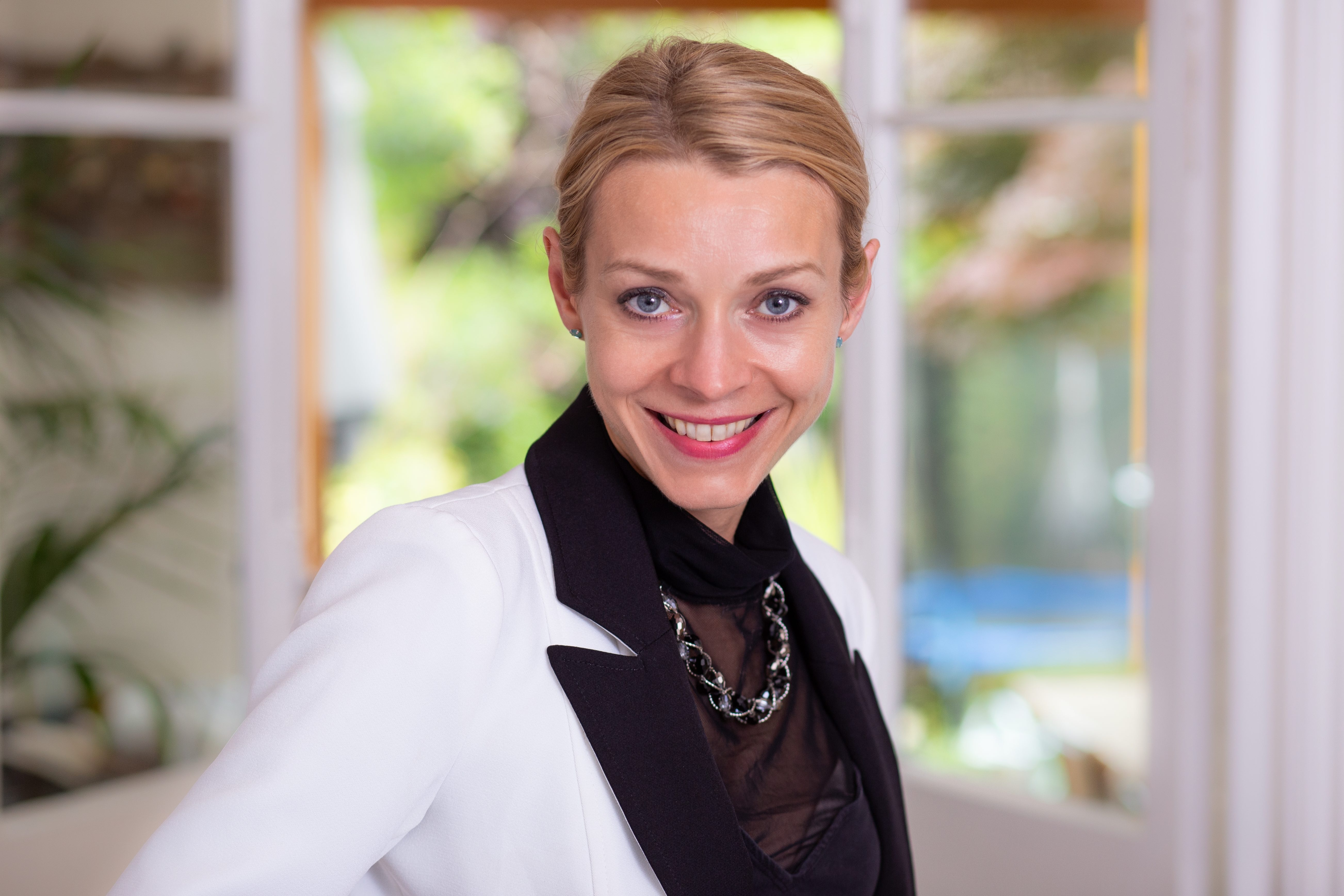
- Education: University of Sheffield, University of Westminster
- Occupations: Writer, journalist
- Notable work: Sugar Daddy Diaries: When a Fantasy became an obsession

Helen Croydon is a British author, broadcaster and former journalist who has written for titles such as The Times, Sunday Times, The Daily Telegraph, The Independent, Metro, Psychologies and worked for the broadcaster ITN.

== Career ==
After graduating in linguistics and Japanese at the University of Sheffield, Croydon started her professional life as a tax consultant for Arthur Andersen before returning to studies to complete a post graduate diploma in broadcast journalism at University of Westminster.

She began her journalism career as a producer and breakfast newsreader for Silk FM radio station in Cheshire and then worked as a producer for ITN for five years before going freelance to focus on writing.

In her early writing days she contributed mostly to The Times, The Sunday Times, The Independent and women's magazines focusing on relationship trends and dating.

Her first scoop was an undercover piece for The Daily Mirror exposing an escort agency using YouTube to approach young girls and entice them into prostitution.

She then became known for immersive journalism pieces, where she would partake in an event, sometimes undercover, and write about her findings. These include a Sunday Times article where she accompanied western men on a paid wife-finding tour in Ukraine, trying out steroids for The Times to expose their prevalence in London gyms, setting up a fake profile on an adultery website to hear the stories of men using them for an article for The Telegraph, and testing the world's most expensive bed for The Sunday Times. She moved on to write broader opinion pieces on the subject of feminism, social trends and questioning society's preoccupation with life-long monogamous relationships, which mirrored the themes of her first two books. In more recent years, after the publication of her third book, she focused on health, fitness and environmental issues for titles including The Telegraph, Metro, Mail Online and fitness magazines.

== Books ==
2011: Sugar Daddy Diaries: When a Fantasy became an obsession (Mainstream Publishing)

2014: Screw the Fairytale: A Modern Girl’s Guide to Sex and Love (John Blake Publishing)

In a media interview in 2014 she admitted facing criticism for the subjects of her first two books and defended the charge of being anti-relationship saying. “I think romantic love is one of the biggest human highs of all. But really, do you have to share a fridge?...I wanted to write about this, question if love has to lead to a sacrifice of self-identity and whether ‘the fairytale’ is such a great life goal in the 21st century.”

2018: This Girl Ran: Tales of a Party Girl Turned Triathlete (Summersdale). This book was longlisted for the William Hill Sports Book of the Year.

== Broadcast ==
Croydon has appeared on programmes such as Newsnight, Sky News, BBC Breakfast, ITV's This Morning, Good Morning Britain, BBC Radio 5 Live and Woman's Hour discussing topical issues relating to her books and doing paper reviews.

== Personal life ==
In 2018 she spoke about her love of triathlon, and has written several articles about how endurance sport has played a role in building resilience in other areas of life.

In 2015 she qualified for ITU Agegroup Triathlon World Championships and competed in Chicago for Great Britain.
