= Helen Shaw =

Helen Shaw may refer to:

- Helen Shaw (politician) (1879–1964), Unionist Party politician in Scotland
- Helen Shaw (actress) (1897–1997), American actress
- Helen Shaw (writer) (1913–1985), New Zealand short-story writer, poet and editor
- Helen Shaw (theater critic), American theater critic
