= Helen Rodd =

Canadian zoologist

Helen Rodd is a Canadian zoologist who is a professor of Ecology and Evolutionary Biology at the University of Toronto.

Rodd's work focuses on reproductive strategies among live-bearing fish as a system to understand mate selection among animals. Her work on mate preference in guppy fish (Poecilia reticulata) attracted media attention in numerous nature magazines and the United States public broadcasting service, as well as academic notice, based upon her research finding that female guppies in Trinidad may choose males for orange coloration similar to a favored food, the fruit of a local tree. In 2001, Rodd was awarded a Premier's Research Excellence Award by the Ontario government for her work in guppy mate selection.

Rodd received her Ph.D. in Biology from York University in Toronto with a thesis titled: Phenotypic plasticity in the life history traits and sexual behaviour of Trinidadian guppies (Poecilia reticulata) in response to their social environment.
