= Helen Bar-Yaacov =

Uzbek-American Rabbi

Personal life
- Born: Uzbekistan

Religious life
- Religion: Judaism

Helen Bar-Yaacov (born 1945 or 1946) is an Uzbekistani-born American rabbi.

== Early life and education ==
Bar-Yaacov was born in Uzbekistan, since her parents had fled Poland during World War II to escape the persecution of the Jews there.

She grew up in Germany and Australia, and lived in Israel as a young woman, working as a tour guide and a teacher there. She was ordained by the Hebrew Union College-Jewish Institute of Religion in New York in 2002.

== Career ==
She is the first ordained female rabbi in West Virginia (though there had been female student rabbis serving before being ordained previous to Bar-Yaacov's service.) She began serving in West Virginia in 2002 at Temple Israel in Charleston.

From 2008 until 2013 she was the rabbi of Evansville's Temple Adath B'nai Israel.
