= Helen Litton =

Irish historian and author

- Occupation: Historian
- Writing career
- Genre: Non-fiction
- Subject: Political history

Helen Litton (née O'Sullivan) is an Irish historian and author. Her research has focused on the political history of Ireland, the Great Irish Famine, and the Easter Rising.

She has a particular focus on the lives of the Daly family from Limerick, publishing biographies of Edward Daly and Thomas Clarke . She is the editor of Revolutionary Woman, the autobiography of Kathleen Clarke. She has been on Raidió Teilifís Éireann several times for her work relating to the Easter Rising. In 2016, she was the chair of the Tom Clarke Memorial Committee.

== Books ==
- Thomas Clarke: 16Lives (Dublin: O'Brien Press, 2014), ISBN 9781847172617
- Edward Daly: 16Lives (Dublin: O'Brien Press, 2013), ISBN 9781847172723
- The World War II Years: The Irish Emergency: An Illustrated History (Wolfhound Press, 2001), ISBN 0863278590
- Oliver Cromwell: An Illustrated History (Wolfhound Press, 2000), ISBN 0863277454
- The Celts: An Illustrated History (Irish Amer Book Company, 1997), ISBN 086327577X
- Irish Rebellions, 1798-1921 (Dublin: O'Brien Press, 1997), ISBN 9781788490344
- The Irish civil war: An illustrated history (Wolfhound Press, 1995), ISBN 0863274803
- The Irish Famine: an illustrated history, (Wolfhound Press, 1994), ISBN 0937702145
- Revolutionary Woman Kathleen Clarke: 1878–1972; an autobiography (Dublin: O'Brien Press, 1991), ISBN 9781847170590
