= Helen Friedman =

American psychologist

Helen Friedman is an American clinical psychologist, therapist, and radio show host in St. Louis, Missouri. She is an associate clinical (adjunct) professor at the Saint Louis University School of Medicine, a past president of the St. Louis Psychological Association, and on the advisory board of the Society for the Advancement of Sexual Health. In full-time private practice, she works in the general areas of anxiety, depression, grief, sexual and relationship issues. Specialties include sexual trauma, sexual compulsivity, dissociative disorders, and gender identity. Her award-winning radio show, "PsychTalk," was featured on KDHX and ran for over seven years. Her work and commentary has been featured in USA Today, the New York Times, the Washington Post, Los Angeles Times, the Boston Globe, the New York Post, Psychology Today, Cosmopolitan, New Woman, Mademoiselle, Redbook, Salon.com, among others.
