= Helen Ward =

Helen Ward may refer to:

- Helen Ward (footballer) (born 1986), Welsh footballer
- Helen Ward (scientist), British professor of public health
- Helen Ward (singer) (1913–1998), American jazz singer
