= Helen Pitts =

Helen Pitts may refer to:

- Helen Pitts Douglass (1838–1903), American suffragist
- Helen Pitts (horse trainer) (born 1974), American racehorse trainer
