= Helen Eastman =

American botanist (1863–1953)

Helen Eastman (1863–1953) was a botanist and author specializing in pteridophytes who wrote a beginner-level book on plant identification which included some novel identifications, credited to Eastman.

== Written works ==
- 1904 – New England Ferns and their Common Allies
