= Helen Nelson =

Helen Nelson may refer to:

- Helen Ewing Nelson (1913–2005), consumer protection advocate
- Helen Nelson (rugby union) (born 1994), Scottish rugby union player
- Oviya (born 1991), real name Helen Nelson, Indian model and actress
