= Helen Stallman =

Australian scientist

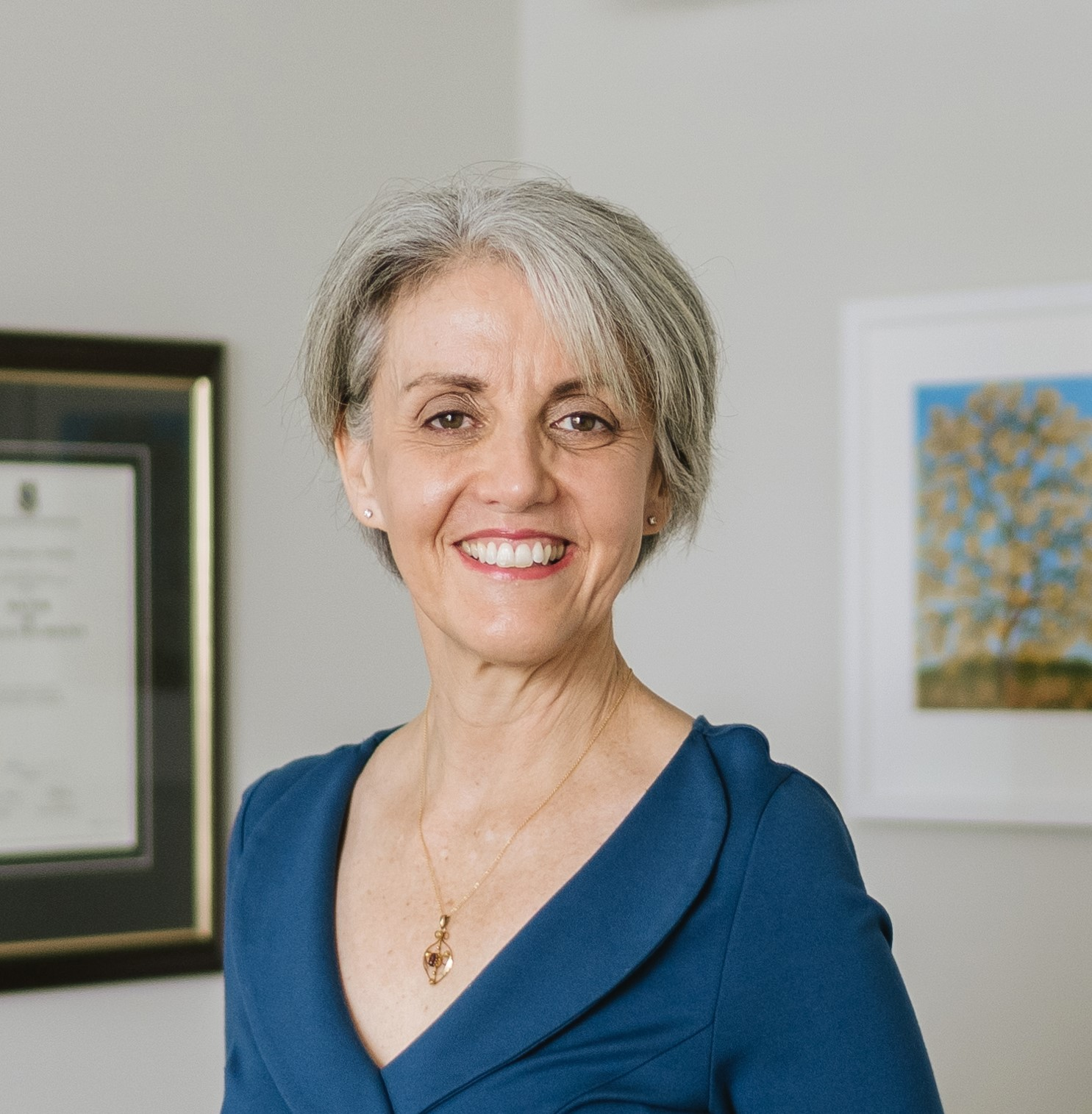
- Born: Brisbane, Australia
- Education: The University of Queensland Ph.D.) The University of Queensland DClinPysch)
- Known for: Health theory of coping Coping planning
- Scientific career
- Fields: Psychology
- Workplaces: Care Collaborate Connect Pty Ltd
- Website: https://www.drhelenstallman.com.au/

Helen Margaret Stallman is an Australian scientist, clinical psychologist and author. She is director of the International Association of University Health and Wellbeing.

== Early life and education ==
Stallman earned a bachelor's degree in science at the University of Southern Queensland, a Bachelor of Psychology (Honours) degree at James Cook University, a Doctor of Clinical Psychology degree at the University of Queensland, a Doctor of Philosophy degree at the University of Queensland and a Certificate in Medical Education at the University of Queensland. She graduated with her daughter, Monique, in 2012.

== Contributions ==
=== University student health and wellbeing ===
Stallman is the founding director of the International Association of University Health and Wellbeing. She led the developed the first online program to support university student health and wellbeing, thedesk and a tool to obtain valid metrics of student learning outcomes while linking them with just-in-time supports, The Learning Thermometer. This was a revolutionary move away from unreliable student satisfaction surveys measures of student success and staff performance.

=== Suicide prevention ===
Stallman developed the world's first consumer-centred approach to supporting people who were upset or who had suicidal thoughts, Care Collaborate Connect.

=== Health theory of coping ===
The health theory of coping overcame limitations of previous coping theories by designating categories that were conceptually clear, mutually exclusive, comprehensive, functionally homogenous, functionally distinct, generative and flexible. Its major differences are that it recognises that all coping reactions as being adaptive and functional that may initially reduce distress. Coping strategies are classified as either healthy or unhealthy, depending on their likelihood of additional adverse consequences.

=== Sleepwalking ===
Stallman led a series of studies understanding the science of sleepwalking including the prevalence, treatments, medication-induced sleepwalking and violence during sleepwalking. Stallman summarised guidelines for the assessment and treatment of sleepwalking in general practice

== Awards and honours ==
- 2019: Healthy Development Adelaide Women's Excellence in Research Award
- 2013: International Education Association of Australia (IEAA) Joint award for Award for Best Practice/Innovation for thedesk
- 2008: UniQuest Trailblazer Winner (Family Transitions Triple P) - innovation competition developed to reward innovative ideas and early-stage research that can benefit the community, industry, or business and generate a financial return.
