= Helen Green =

American politician (died 1991)

Member of the Connecticut House of Representatives from Granby
- In office 1925–1927 Serving with George W. Newton
- Preceded by: George W. Newton; Selden W. Hayes
- Succeeded by: Edwin H. Shattuck; Harold M. Hayes

Personal details
- Born: 1893 or 1894 Granby, Connecticut, U.S.
- Died: June 8, 1991 (aged 97) Granby, Connecticut, U.S.
- Party: Republican

Helen Amelia Green (1893 or 1894 – June 8, 1991) was an American politician who served in the Connecticut House of Representatives from 1925 to 1927, representing the town of Granby as a Republican.

== Personal life ==
Helen Amelia Green was born in 1893 or 1894 in Granby, Connecticut, to Charles A. and Emogene H. Green. She was the youngest of seven children. Green taught elementary school in East Hartford and was a principal from 1930 until her retirement in 1963.

== Political career ==
A Republican, Green was elected to the Connecticut House of Representatives in 1924, and she served one term representing the town of Granby alongside fellow Republican George W. Newton. She was clerk of the legislative committee on new counties and county seats. Green did not run for reelection in 1926.

== Death ==
Green died on June 8, 1991, at her home in Granby. She was 97.
