= Helen Lingard =

Australian scientist

- Born: United Kingdom
- Education: University of Hong Kong
- Awards: Australian Research Council Future Fellowship
- Scientific career
- Fields: Construction, Health and Safety
- Workplaces: RMIT
- Thesis: Safety in Hong Kong’s construction industry: changing worker behaviour (1995)

Helen Lingard is a Distinguished Professor at RMIT. She leads RMIT’s Construction Work Health & Safety Research group, which she founded in 2014. She is actively linking her research work with industry, unions and government to create evidence-based tools that protect workers’ health, safety and work–life balance across the global construction sector.

== Education ==
Lingard earned a B.A. (Hons) in politics from the University of Newcastle (UK) before completing her Ph.D. in Construction Safety at the University of Hong Kong in 1995. She gained initial experience working on civil-engineering projects—most notably the Hong Kong International Airport and the record-breaking Tsing Ma Bridge—an experience that ignited her commitment to improving construction workers’ health, safety, and overall wellbeing.

== Career ==
Since 2016, Lingard has been a Distinguished Professor at the Royal Melbourne Institute of Technology’s School of Property, Construction & Project Management, where she also founded and directs the Construction Work Health & Safety Research group (est. 2014). Earlier, she secured an Australian Research Council Future Fellowship (2009–2013) to pioneer integrated OHS strategies for construction projects. Her academic journey includes roles as Professor and Associate Professor at RMIT (2005–2015), Senior Lecturer and Lecturer at the University of Melbourne, and Senior Research Fellow at the University of Hong Kong. Before entering academia, she built frontline expertise as an OHS Advisor with Costain in Hong Kong and as Principal Consultant with ARK Consulting in Australia. In 2024, Lingard established the Safety and Health Innovation Network (SHINe) which aims to bring industry leaders and researchers together to deliver pioneering, practice-focused studies that cut deaths, serious injuries and chronic ill-health in Australia’s construction sector.

== Awards ==
Lingard received multiple national and international awards:

- Australian Research Council Future Fellowship – inaugural building-discipline recipient (2009).
- CIOB Best International Paper, ARCOM Conference (2016) for a participatory-video study on subcontractor safety-rule violations.
- Best Paper Award, Journal of Construction Engineering & Management (ASCE) (2020) for “Safety at the Front Line”.
- RMIT Award for Research Impact (Enterprise) for industry-adopted safety-culture tools.
- Appointed Distinguished Professor – RMIT’s highest academic rank (2016).

== Selected works ==
- Lingard, Helen; Turner, Michelle (2023), Work, Health and Wellbeing in the Construction Industry, Routledge & CRC Press
- Lingard, Helen; Oswald, David (2020-04-01). "Safety at the Front Line: Social Negotiation of Work and Safety at the Principal Contractor–Subcontractor Interface". Journal of Construction Engineering and Management. 146 (4): 04020024. doi:10.1061/(ASCE)CO.1943-7862.0001799. ISSN 1943-7862.
- Lingard, Helen; Cooke, Tracy; Blismas, Nick (2010-10-01). "Properties of group safety climate in construction: the development and evaluation of a typology". Construction Management and Economics. 28 (10): 1099–1112. doi:10.1080/01446193.2010.501807. ISSN 0144-6193.
- Lingard, Helen (2004-04-01). "Work and Family Sources of Burnout in the Australian Engineering Profession: Comparison of Respondents in Dual- and Single-Earner Couples, Parents, and Nonparents". Journal of Construction Engineering and Management. 130 (2): 290–298. doi:10.1061/(ASCE)0733-9364(2004)130:2(290). ISSN 0733-9364.
