= Helen Richardson =

Helen Richardson may refer to:

- Helen Jairag Richardson (born 1938), Bollywood actress
- Helen Richardson-Walsh (born 1981), English field hockey player
- Helen Richardson (1894–1955), cousin and widow of Theodore Dreiser
- Helen Cunningham or Richardson, a fictional character in the British Channel 4 soap opera Hollyoaks
