= Helen Wright =

Helen Wright may refer to:

- Mary Helen Wright Greuter (1914–1997), American astronomer and historian
- Helen Wright (actress) (1868–1928), American actress
- Helen Williams (curler) (born 1973), née Wright, Australian curler
- Helen Wright (politician) born 1943, first female lord provost of Dundee
