= Helen Resor =

Helen Resor may refer to:

- Helen Lansdowne Resor (1886–1964), American advertising executive
- Helen Resor (ice hockey) (born 1985), American Olympic ice hockey athlete
