= Helen Keller (disambiguation) =

Helen Keller (1880–1968) was an American author, advocate, activist, and lecturer.

Helen Keller may also refer to:

- Helen Keller (judge) (born 1964), Swiss lawyer and judge
- Helen Rex Keller (1877–1967), American librarian and author of reference books
- Helen Keller (EP), a single by American drag queen Manila Luzon
- Statue of Helen Keller, a sculpture depicting the activist of the same name
