= Helen Baker =

Helen Baker may refer to:

- Helen Baker (tennis), American tennis player
- Helen Baker (author) (born 1948), English author
