= Helen Bullard =

American landscape architect (1896–1987)

Helen Bullard (June 28, 1896 - November 1987) was an American landscape architect. In 1918 she earned a B.S. in landscape architecture (which was then called landscape art) from Cornell University. She worked as William Manning's Boston office's chief plantsman and planting designer from 1921 until 1935. She became Junior Landscape Architect for the New York State Department of Public Works in 1938 and stayed there until her retirement in 1964. She was also a landscape architect for the 1939 New York World's Fair.

She worked on community pageants and private estates, and did projects for the Long Island State Park Commission, Rye Beach Park, and the Southern State Parkway. She also lectured on city planning, garden design, gardening issues, and housing. She never had an independent practice.

The Helen Bullard Papers, 1920-1950 are held as Collection Number: 6501 at the Division of Rare and Manuscript Collections at Cornell University Library.
