= Helen Rulison Shipley =

American dentist

- (undated)
- Born: Helen Rulison; July 23, 1870; Dayton, Nevada, US
- Died: June 6, 1955 (aged 84); Reno
- Education: University of Nevada, Reno
- Known for: Nevada’s first female dentist
- Medical career
- Profession: Dentist

Helen Rulison Shipley (née Helen Rulison) (July 23, 1870 – June 6, 1955) was Nevada’s first female dentist. Born in Dayton, Nevada, US, she had at least two siblings, brothers, who were dentists. She graduated from the University of Nevada, Reno in 1889, and then worked as a teacher. When she returned to school, she studied dentistry at the University of California, San Francisco. After graduation in 1896, she practiced in San Francisco until 1907, in Goldfield until 1912, and then Tonopah, where she met and subsequently married Robert Shipley. They moved to Reno in 1926, where she worked for another twenty years. She died in Reno in 1955.
