= Helen Gardner =

Helen Gardner may refer to:

- Helen Gardner (critic) (1908–1986), English critic and academic
- Helen Gardner (art historian) (1878–1946), American art historian and educator
- Helen Gardner (actress) (1884–1968), silent film actress
- Helen H. Gardener (1853–1925), American author, rationalist public intellectual, political activist, and government functionary
