= Helen Gray =

Helen Gray may refer to:

- Helen Gray (swimmer) (born 1956), Australian Olympic swimmer
- Helen Gray Cone (1859–1934), poet and academic
- Nelly Gray, song
