= Helen Neal =

First Black graduate of West Texas State University

Helen Louise Elliott Neal, along with Marvell White, was the first American black graduate of West Texas State University in 1962. In 2019, the school, now named West Texas A & M University, opened the Nathaniel and Helen Neal Multicultural Suite to commemorate her experience.

She was born Helen Louise Elliot on September 17, 1927, in Okmulgee, Oklahoma, United States. She was married to Nat Neal, who in 1971 became the first black faculty member at West Texas State. Helen first attended all-black Langston College in Oklahoma. The Neals moved to Amarillo in 1955, there were no local colleges that would accept black students. When WT was forced by the federal Government to integrate in 1961, Neal enrolled.

Neal died on October 15, 2013.
