= Helen Louise Babcock =

American educator, elocutionist, dramatic reader

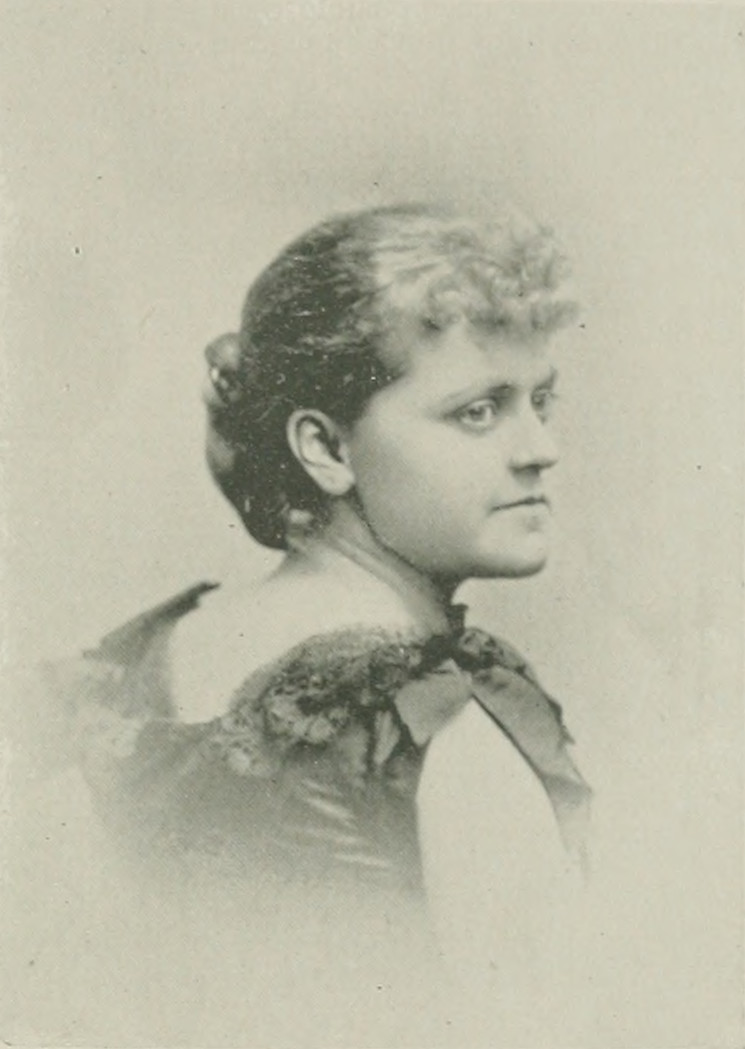
Helen Louise B. Babcock, "A woman of the century"

Helen Louise B. Babcock (August 13, 1867-July 5, 1955) was an American educator, elocutionist, and dramatic reader.

== Early years and education ==
Helen Louise Bailey was born in Galva, Illinois. August 13, 1867. She early displayed a marked talent for elocution and on reaching woman's estate she decided to make dramatic reading her profession. With that aim she became a pupil in the Cumnock School of Oratory of the Northwestern University, and, being an earnest student, she was graduated with the highest honors.

== Career ==
Afterwards, she became an assistant instructor in the same oratorical school, and was very successful in the work of developing elocutionary and dramatic talents in others. Perfectly familiar with the work, she was able to guide students rapidly over the rough places. After severing her connection with the Cumnock school, she taught for a time in Mount Vernon Seminary and College, Washington, D.C. After the death of her mother, in 1890, she accompanied her father abroad and spent some time in visiting the principal countries of Europe. In 1891, she married Dr. F. C. Babcock, a successful physician of Hastings, Nebraska, where she lived afterwards.

In 1917, she graduated from the Posse Gymnasium.
