= Helen Skouteris =

Australian academic

Helen Skouteris FASSA is an Australian academic and researcher. She specialises in women and children’s health and wellbeing, having published 300 articles in the field. She is a Monash Warwick Professor of Health and Social Care Improvement and Implementation Science in the School of Public Health and Preventive Medicine at Monash University.

== Career ==
Skouteris' research is primarily centered on reducing the prevalence of obesity by empowering people to enhance health and wellbeing from preconception through adolescence. She has influenced policy reforms and worked with social services and educational sectors to improve health outcomes for individuals and families. In 2022, she was named Editor-in-Chief of the journal of Health and Social Care in the Community. In recognition of her achievements, she was elected Fellow of the Academy of Social Sciences in Australia in 2023.
