= Helen Golden =

Helen Golden may refer to:

- Helen Golden (athlete)
- Helen Golden (singer)
