= Helen Whelton =

Irish epidemiologist

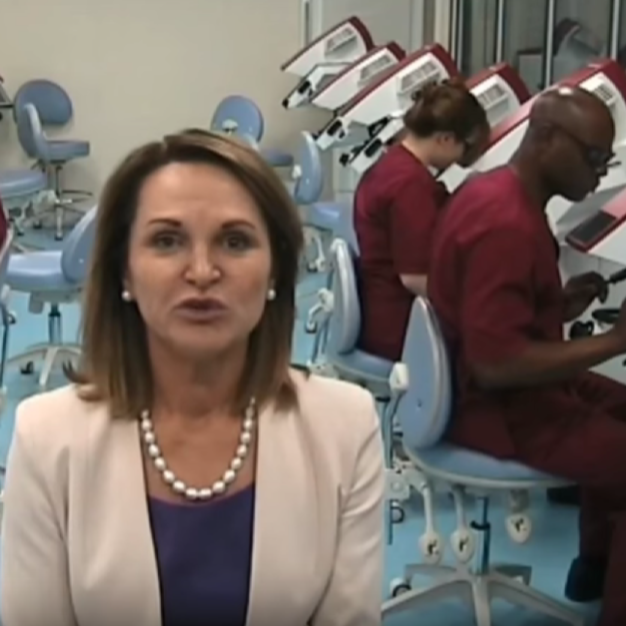
Image of Prof Helen Whelton

Helen Whelton is an Irish epidemiologist and educator. She is HSE South South West Hospital Group's chief academic officer and head of the College of Medicine and Health at the University College Cork (UCC).

== Biography ==
Whelton earned a Ph.D. in oral epidemiology from UCC. Also from UCC, she earned a BDS in dentistry and a Masters in Dental Public Health in 1999.

== Career ==
At the University of Leeds, Whelton was Dean of Dentistry and Faculty Lead for Internationalisation, since October 2013.

Whelton was Dean of the Graduate School, College of Medicine and Health at UCC from 2009 until 2013 and since 2002, their Oral Health Services Research Centre.

== Publications ==
- Helen Whelton: 'It is difficult to imagine the population's decay levels without fluoridation'. Br Dent J 214, 209–211 (2013). https://doi.org/10.1038/sj.bdj.2013.210. Published in the British Dental Journal in 2013.
