= Helen Tucker =

Helen Tucker may refer to:

- Helen F. Tucker, American biochemist
- Helen Jenkins, British triathlete
