= Helen Watson =

Helen Watson may refer to:

- Helen Watson (cricketer) (born 1972), New Zealand cricketer
- Helen Watson (singer-songwriter), British singer and recording artist
- Helen Turner Watson (1917–1992), American nurse and educator
