= Helen Bershad =

American abstract expressionist painter (born 1934)

- Born: 1934 (age 91–92); Philadelphia
- Education: Moore College of Art

Helen Bershad (born 1934, Philadelphia, United States) is an American abstract expressionist painter.

== Career ==
She graduated from Moore College of Art.

She was noted for her unique and intense use of color. She has exhibited in galleries in New York City, Philadelphia, Los Angeles and other cities in the United States.

Her work is in the collection of the Philadelphia Museum of Art, Woodmere Art Museum, and other museums and private collections.

== Sources ==
- Woodmere Art Museum (Philadelphia) catalogue 1997 "Helen Bershad Retrospective"
