= Helen Hedges =

New Zealand education academic

- Education: Massey University
- Scientific career
- Fields: Early childhood curriculum, early childhood pedagogy, children’s interests, funds of knowledge and identity, working theories
- Workplaces: University of Auckland
- Thesis: Funds of knowledge in early childhood communities of inquiry (2007)

Helen Hedges is a New Zealand education academic. As of 2018 she became a full professor at the University of Auckland, now emeritus professor.

== Academic career ==
After a 2002 MEd Early Years thesis titled 'Subject content knowledge in early childhood curriculum and pedagogy' and a 2007 PhD titled 'Funds of knowledge in early childhood communities of inquiry' undertaken at Massey University, Hedges published prolifically. She joined the University of Auckland in 2003, rising to full professor in 2018.

== Selected works ==
- Hedges, Helen; Cullen, Joy; Jordan, Barbara (April 2011). "Early years curriculum: funds of knowledge as a conceptual framework for children's interests". Journal of Curriculum Studies. 43 (2): 185–205. doi:10.1080/00220272.2010.511275. S2CID 16400275.
- Hedges, Helen; Cullen, Joy (March 2005). "Subject Knowledge in Early Childhood Curriculum and Pedagogy: Beliefs and Practices". Contemporary Issues in Early Childhood. 6 (1): 66–79. doi:10.2304/ciec.2005.6.1.10. S2CID 145463385.
- Hedges, Helen; Cullen, Joy (July 2012). "Participatory learning theories: a framework for early childhood pedagogy". Early Child Development and Care. 182 (7): 921–940. doi:10.1080/03004430.2011.597504. S2CID 144261954.
- Hedges, Helen (December 2000). "Teaching in Early Childhood: Time to Merge Constructivist Views so Learning through Play Equals Teaching through Play". Australasian Journal of Early Childhood. 25 (4): 16–21. doi:10.1177/183693910002500404. S2CID 140931471.
- Hedges, Helen (February 2012). "Teachers' funds of knowledge: a challenge to evidence-based practice". Teachers and Teaching. 18 (1): 7–24. doi:10.1080/13540602.2011.622548. S2CID 144259514.
