= Helen Cross =

Helen Cross may refer to:

- Helen Cross (author) (born 1967), English author
- Helen Cross (politician), Australian politician
- Helen Cross (physician), British paediatric doctor and research professor
