= Gerald Gitner =

American businessman (born 1945)

- Born: April 10, 1945 (age 81); Boston, Massachusetts
- Education: Boston University (BA '66); University of Rochester (MBA '68)
- Spouse: Deanne Gebell (m. 1968)

Gerald Leslie Gitner (born April 10, 1945) is an American former aviation executive who occupied high-level positions at Trans World Airlines (TWA), Pan American World Airways (Pan Am), People Express Airlines, and other major airlines. He has also served as chairman and director for several aviation-related and non-aviation-related companies.

Gitner is best known for his time as the CEO of TWA in the late '90s during which time he increased fleet numbers, renewed the fleet, improved the company's debt structure, won two J.D. Power and Associates awards, and ultimately facilitated the 2001 sale of the company to American Airlines.

== Education ==
Born In Boston, he attended Boston Latin School, then attended Boston University College of Arts and Sciences where he graduated cum laude with a bachelor's degree in 1966. He then attended the University of Rochester where he received a Master of Business Administration (MBA) in 1968. Among other bequests, the Gerald and Deanne Gitner Family Innovation in Teaching with Technology Award is now presented annually by Boston University, where Gitner was a trustee and continues his association, the Gitner Prize for Teaching at the University of Rochester’s Simon Business School and the Gitner Family Photojournalism Endowed Award is presented annually by the Rochester Institute of Technology.

== Career ==
Gitner began his career at TWA in 1968. He would work his way up to vice president for scheduling before leaving in 1974. He moved on to Texas International Airlines where he eventually became the Senior Vice President of Marketing. In 1980, he left Texas International and co-founded People Express Airlines, a low-cost airline based in the northeastern United States. He was the president of that company before leaving in 1982 to become the Senior Vice President of Marketing and Planning at Pan American World Airways. He would eventually add the titles of vice chairman, chief financial officer, and Chairman/CEO of Pan Am World Services. In his time at Pan Am, Gitner worked on Pan Am's debt, reworked the fleet, and raised cash. He also participated in the sale of Pan Am's Pacific flights to United Airlines.

Gitner left Pan Am in 1985, and became the President of Texas Air Corporation, an airline holding company (Continental Airlines, New York Air, etc.). He would leave Texas Air in 1986, and, soon thereafter, joined ATASCO USA, an aircraft trading and leasing entity. He served as the CEO of ATASCO until 1990. In the early 1990s, Gitner simultaneously served on the board of directors at TWA while also serving as the chairman of the board at Avalon Group Ltd., an investment banking firm he co-founded. He was elected acting CEO of TWA in late 1996 and assumed the position of Chairman and CEO in February 1997. In his time as CEO, Gitner improved on-time performance, increased the TWA fleet numbers, restructured the company's debt, and helped navigate the company toward its eventual absorption into American Airlines. Gitner stepped down as CEO in 1999, while remaining Chairman. During his tenure, the company won two J.D. Power and Associates awards (one for long-haul flights in 1998 and one for short-haul flights in 1999).

Since his time at TWA, Gitner has gone on to be a part of numerous other companies and firms. He was appointed to the Factory Card Outlet (now Party City) board of directors in 2000 and serves as the chairman of D.G. Associates Inc. He was the non-executive Chairman of the Board for Kitty Hawk Aircargo from 2002 (soon after it emerged from reorganization) to 2007. He served as a director for Tricom, S.A, a telecommunications company in the Dominican Republic. He also served as a director for CIFG Holdings and is a principal at Cross Continental Capital. In 2024 he was appointed Chairman of the Advisory Board of Matternet.com a premier manufacturer and operator of delivery drones worldwide.

Gitner served as a Trustee at Boston University from 1984 to 1996 and is now a trustee emeritus there. He also served as a trustee for the Rochester Institute of Technology and the American College of Management and Technology in Croatia. He served as a member of the Chancellor's Council of the University of Missouri–St. Louis. He is currently on Advisory Boards for Boston University, Lynn Univeristy as Chairman of the AeronauticsSTrategic Council and serves on the advisory board of The Simon School of Business at the University of Rochester. In 2020 he was presented with the Distinguished Alumnus Award, 2020 from the Simon Business School of The University of Rochester. Gitner served as Chairman of the Financial Advisory Board for the Town of Highland Beach in Florida from 2012-2015. He served as the chairman for eJet Aviation Holdings, Inc. from 2008-2015. He previously served as the Chairman of Global Aero Holdings, LTD. until 2025. He is a member of Who's Who in America.

== Personal life ==
Gitner met his late wife, Deanne, while in graduate school at the University of Rochester. The couple has two sons. Their older son, Daniel, is a lawyer in New York City, and their younger son, Seth, is an Associate Professor of Magazine, News and Digital Journalism Journalism and Visual Communications at the Newhouse School at Syracuse University.
