= Trans World Airlines =

Airline of the United States (1930–2001)

Trans World Airlines, Inc.
- Final TWA logo (Late 1995–2001)

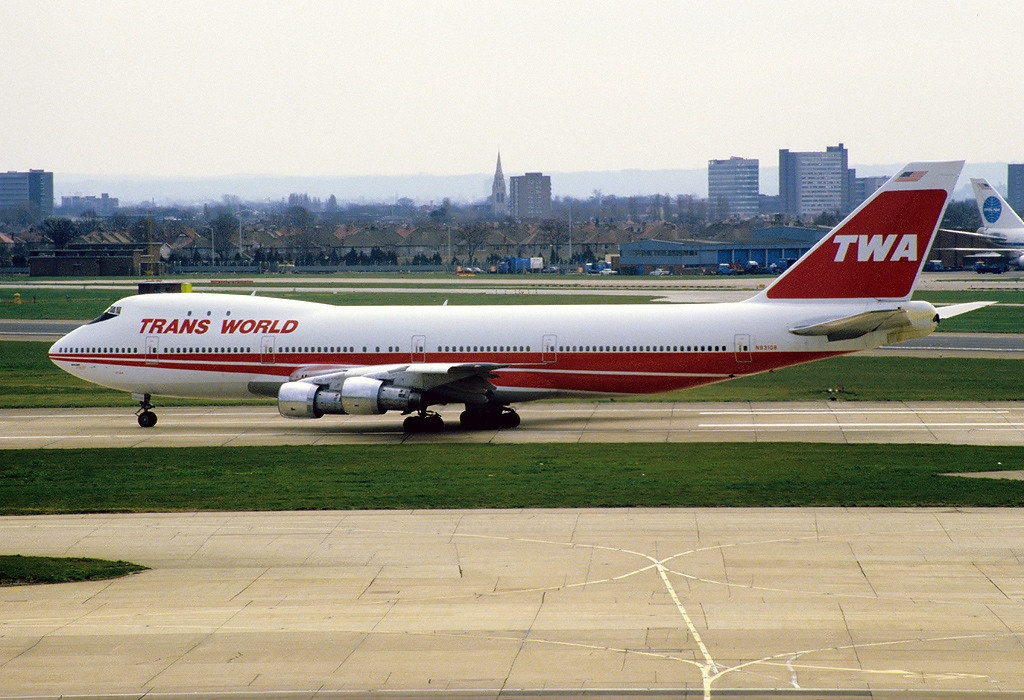
- A Boeing 747-131 of TWA at Heathrow Airport in 1984
IATA	ICAO	Call sign
TW	TWA	TWA
- Founded: July 16, 1930; 96 years ago (as Transcontinental & Western Air)
- Ceased operations: December 1, 2001; 24 years ago (merged with American Airlines)
- Hubs: Kansas City–Downtown (1951–1972); Kansas City–International (1972–1982); St. Louis (1982–2001)
- Focus cities: Athens–Ellinikon; Atlanta (1992–1994); Boston; Chicago–O'Hare (1958–1982); Denver–Stapleton; London–Heathrow (before April 1991); Los Angeles; New York–JFK; Paris–Charles de Gaulle; Pittsburgh (1966–1985); San Juan (1999–2001)
- Frequent-flyer program: Aviators
- Subsidiaries: Trans World Connection (1999–2001); Trans World Express (1993–1995)
- Parent company: Trans World Corporation (1961–1992); AMR Corporation (2001)
- Headquarters: New York City (1930–1931; 1964–1987); Kansas City, Missouri (1931–1964); Mount Kisco, New York (1987–1992); St. Louis, Missouri (1992–Apr 2001); Fort Worth, Texas (Apr 2001–Dec 2001)
- Key people: Dick Robbins (1930–1934); Jack Frye & Paul Richter (1931–1947); Walter A. Hamilton (1931–1946); Howard Hughes (1939–1965); Ralph Damon (1949–1956); Carter Burgess (1956–1957); Charles Thomas (1958–1960); Charles Tillinghast (1961–1976); L.E. Smart (since 1976); C.E. Meyer Jr. (1976–1985); Carl Icahn (1985–1993); William R. Howard (1993–1994); Jeffrey H. Erickson (1994–1997); Gerald L. Gitner (1997–1999); William Compton (1999–2001); Donald J. Carty (2001); Robert W. Baker (2001)
- Website: twa.com at the Wayback Machine (archived 2001-10-25))

Trans World Airlines (TWA) was a trunk carrier, a scheduled airline in the United States that operated from 1930 until it was acquired by American Airlines in 2001. It was formed as Transcontinental & Western Air to operate a route from New York City to Los Angeles via St. Louis, Kansas City, and other stops, with Ford Trimotors. With American, United, and Eastern, it was one of the "Big Four" domestic airlines in the United States formed by the Spoils Conference of 1930.

Howard Hughes began to acquire TWA stock in 1939 and held a controlling interest by 1944. After World War II, Hughes led the expansion of the airline to serve Europe, the Middle East, and Asia, making TWA a second unofficial flag carrier of the United States after Pan Am. Hughes gave up control in the 1960s, and the new management of TWA acquired Hilton International and Century 21 in an attempt to diversify the company's business.

As the Airline Deregulation Act of 1978 led to a wave of airline failures, start-ups, and takeovers in the United States, TWA was spun off from its holding company in 1984. Carl Icahn acquired control of TWA and took the company private in a leveraged buyout in 1988. TWA became saddled with debt, sold its London routes, underwent Chapter 11 restructuring in 1992 and 1995, and was further stressed by the explosion of TWA Flight 800 in 1996, which would become the third deadliest aviation accident in U.S. history.

TWA was headquartered at one time in Kansas City, Missouri, and planned to make Kansas City International Airport its main domestic and international hub, but abandoned this plan in the 1970s. The airline later developed its largest hub at St. Louis Lambert International Airport. Its main transatlantic hub was the TWA Flight Center at John F. Kennedy International Airport in New York City, an architectural icon designed by Eero Saarinen, and completed in 1962.

In January 2001, TWA filed for a third and final bankruptcy and was acquired by American Airlines. American laid off many former TWA employees in the wake of the September 11, 2001, attacks. TWA continued to exist as an LLC under American Airlines until July 1, 2003. American Airlines closed the St. Louis hub in 2009.

== History ==
=== 1930s ===
==== Founding: TWA ====
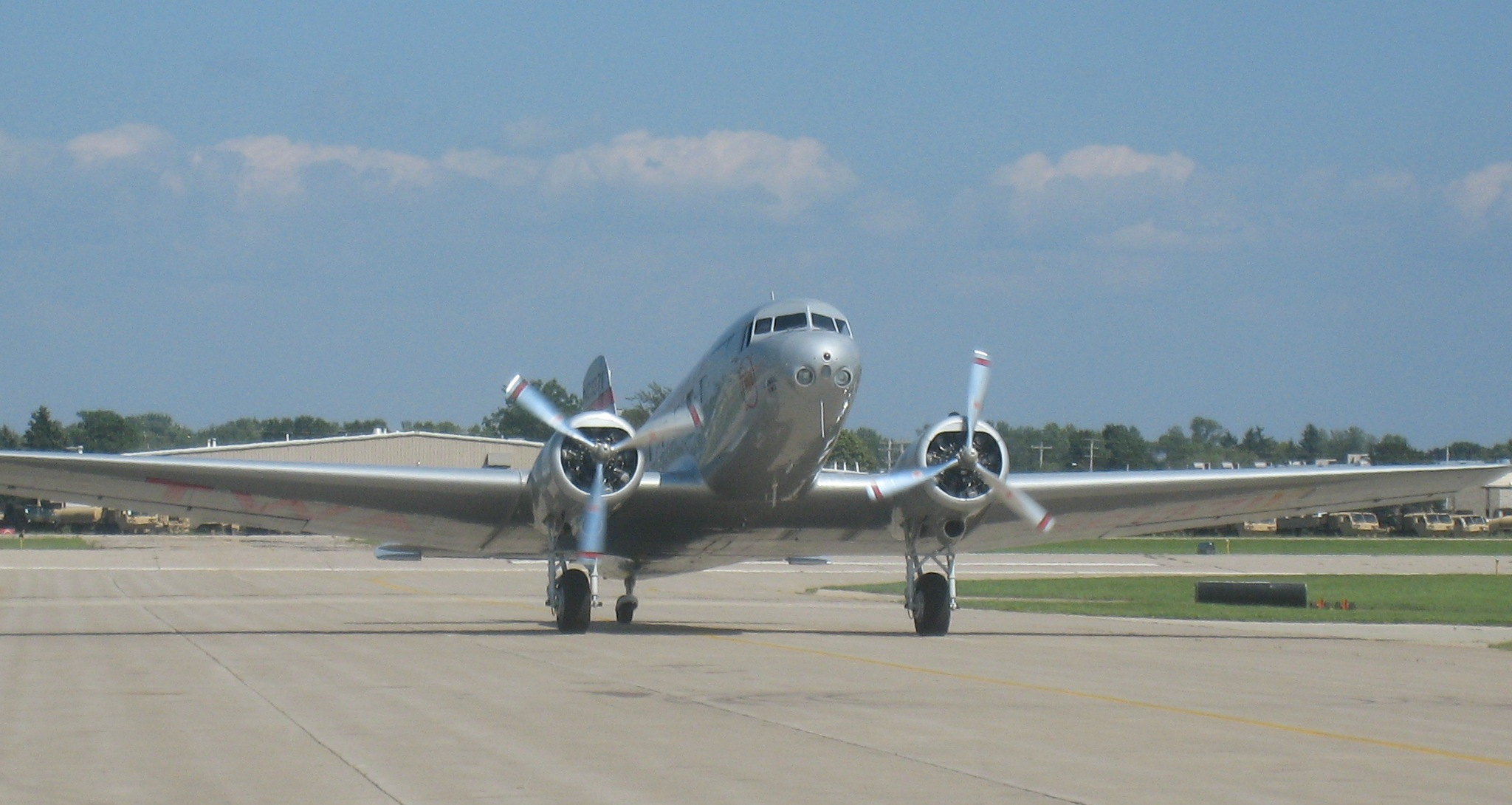
Lindbergh Line DC-2

TWA's corporate history dates from July 16, 1930, and the forced merger of Transcontinental Air Transport (TAT), Western Air Express (WAE), Maddux Air Lines, Standard, and Pittsburgh Aviation Industries Corporation (PAIC) to form Transcontinental & Western Air (T&WA) on 1 Oct. 1930. The companies merged at the urging of Postmaster General Walter Folger Brown, who was looking for bigger airlines to give airmail contracts to.

The airline brought high-profile aviation pioneers who would give the airline the panache of being called "The Airman's Airline". TAT had the marquee expertise of Charles Lindbergh and was already offering a 48-hour combination of plane and train trips across the United States. WAE had the expertise of Jack Frye. TWA became known as "The Lindbergh Line", with the "Shortest Route Coast to Coast".

On October 25, 1930, the airline offered one of the first all-plane scheduled services from coast to coast. The route took 36 hours, which included an overnight stay in Kansas City. In summer 1931, TWA moved its headquarters from New York to Kansas City, Missouri.

==== DC-1, DC-2 and DC-3 ====
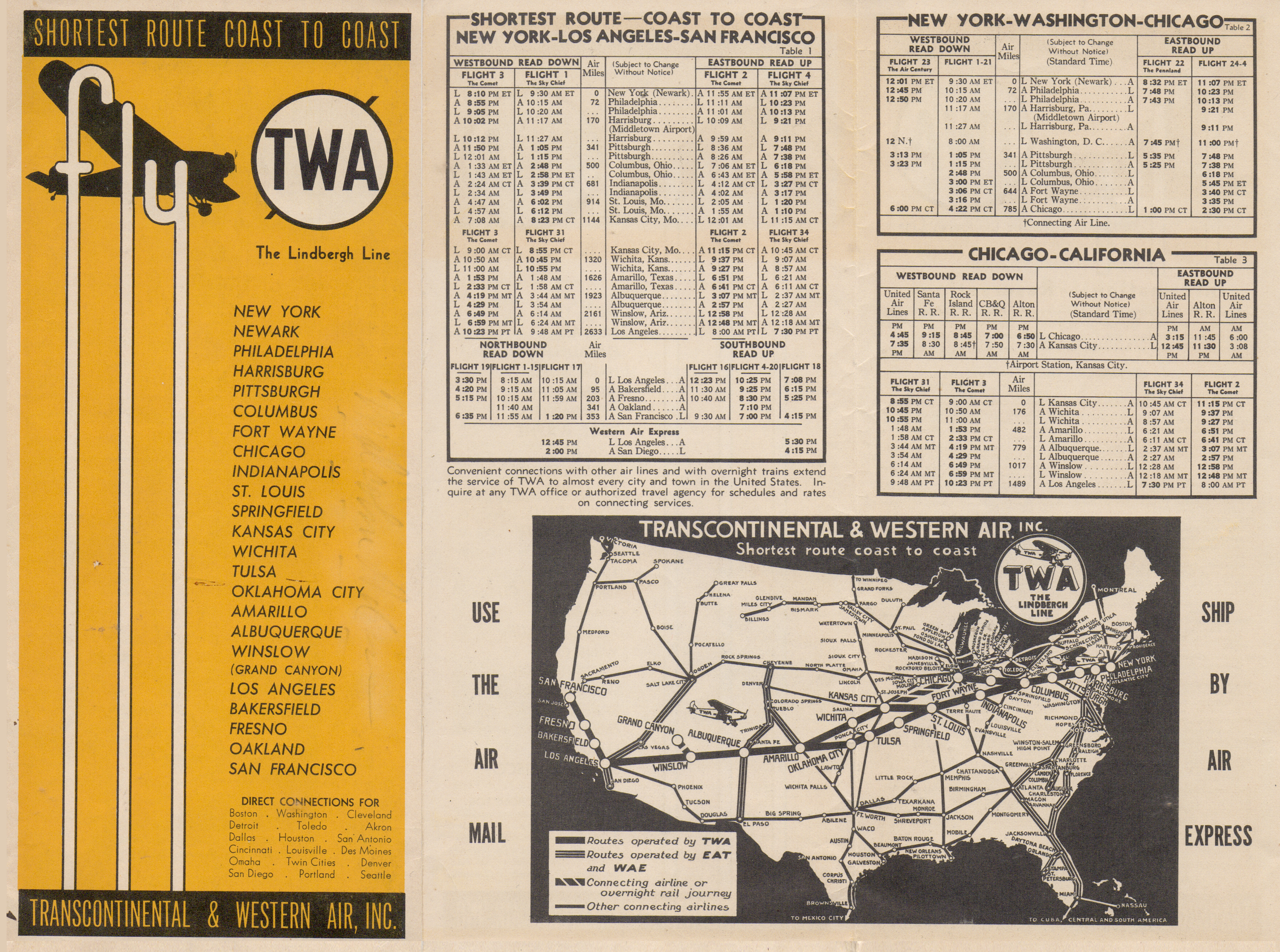
TWA coast-to-coast schedules and route map, September 1933

On March 31, 1931, the airline suffered after the 1931 Transcontinental & Western Air Fokker F-10 crash near Matfield Green, Kansas. The crash killed all eight on board, including University of Notre Dame football coach Knute Rockne. The cause of the crash was linked to the wooden wings, one of which failed in flight. As a consequence, all of the airline's Fokker F.10s were grounded and later scrapped. TWA needed a replacement aircraft, but the first sixty modern all-metal Boeing 247s were promised to Boeing's sister company United Airlines (both were subsidiaries of United Aircraft and Transport Corporation). TWA was forced to sponsor the development of a new airplane design. Specifications included the ability to fly the high altitude route between Winslow, Arizona, and Albuquerque, New Mexico, with one engine inoperative. Other specifications included the capacity to carry 12 passengers and a range of 1,080 miles.

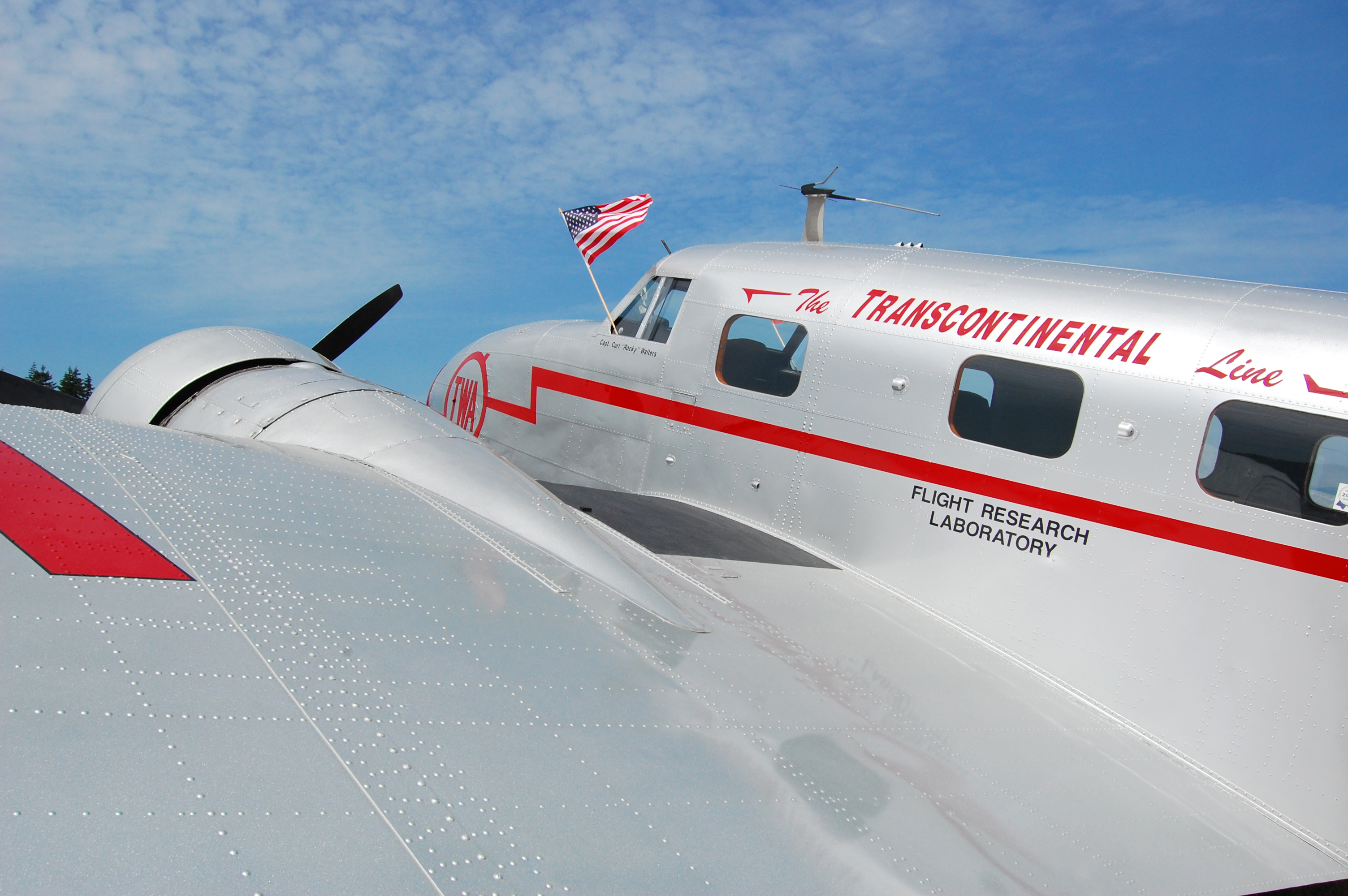
A Lockheed 12A, used by TWA as an experimental/test aircraft

On September 20, 1932, the development contract was signed with Douglas Aircraft Company and the Douglas DC-1 was delivered to TWA in December 1933, the sole example of its type. On February 18, 1934, Frye (pilot) and Eastern Air Lines' head Eddie Rickenbacker (co-pilot), flew the DC-1 from Glendale, California, to Newark, New Jersey, setting a transcontinental record of 13 hours and 4 minutes. On April 17, Frye was elected president of TWA. Throughout 1934, Tommy Tomlinson set further load and distance records with the DC-1. At the same time, TWA used its Northrop Gamma as an "experimental Overweather Laboratory", in a desire to fly at altitudes above the weather.

The DC-1 was followed by the delivery of 32 Douglas DC-2s that started operations in May 1934 on TWA's Columbus–Pittsburgh–Newark route. Most were phased out by 1937 as the Douglas DC-3 started service, but several DC-2s would be operational through the early years of World War II. TWA started using the DC-3 on June 1, 1937. The fleet included ten DST sleeper aircraft and eight standard DC-3 day versions.

==== Airmail and Hughes ====
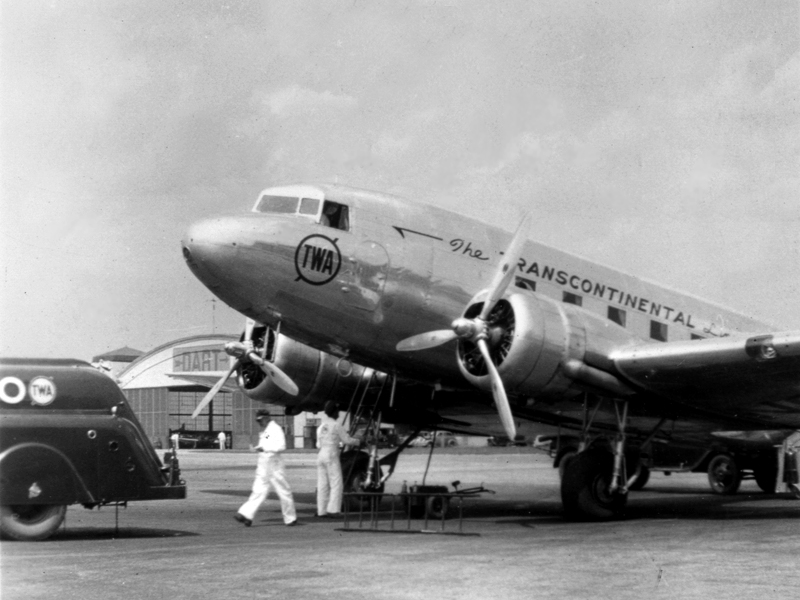
A TWA Douglas DC-3 is prepared for takeoff from Columbus, Ohio, in 1940.

In 1934, following charges of favouritism in the contracts, the Air Mail scandal erupted, leading to the Air Mail Act of 1934, which dissolved the forced Transcontinental/Western merger and ordered the United States Army Air Service to deliver the mail. However, Transcontinental opted to retain the T&WA name. With the company facing financial hardship, Lehman Brothers and John D. Hertz took over ownership of the company. The Army fliers had a series of crashes, and it was decided to privatize the delivery with the provision that no former companies could bid on the contracts. T&WA added the suffix "Inc." to its name, thus qualifying it as a different company. It was awarded 60% of its old contracts back in May 1934 and won back the rest within a few years.

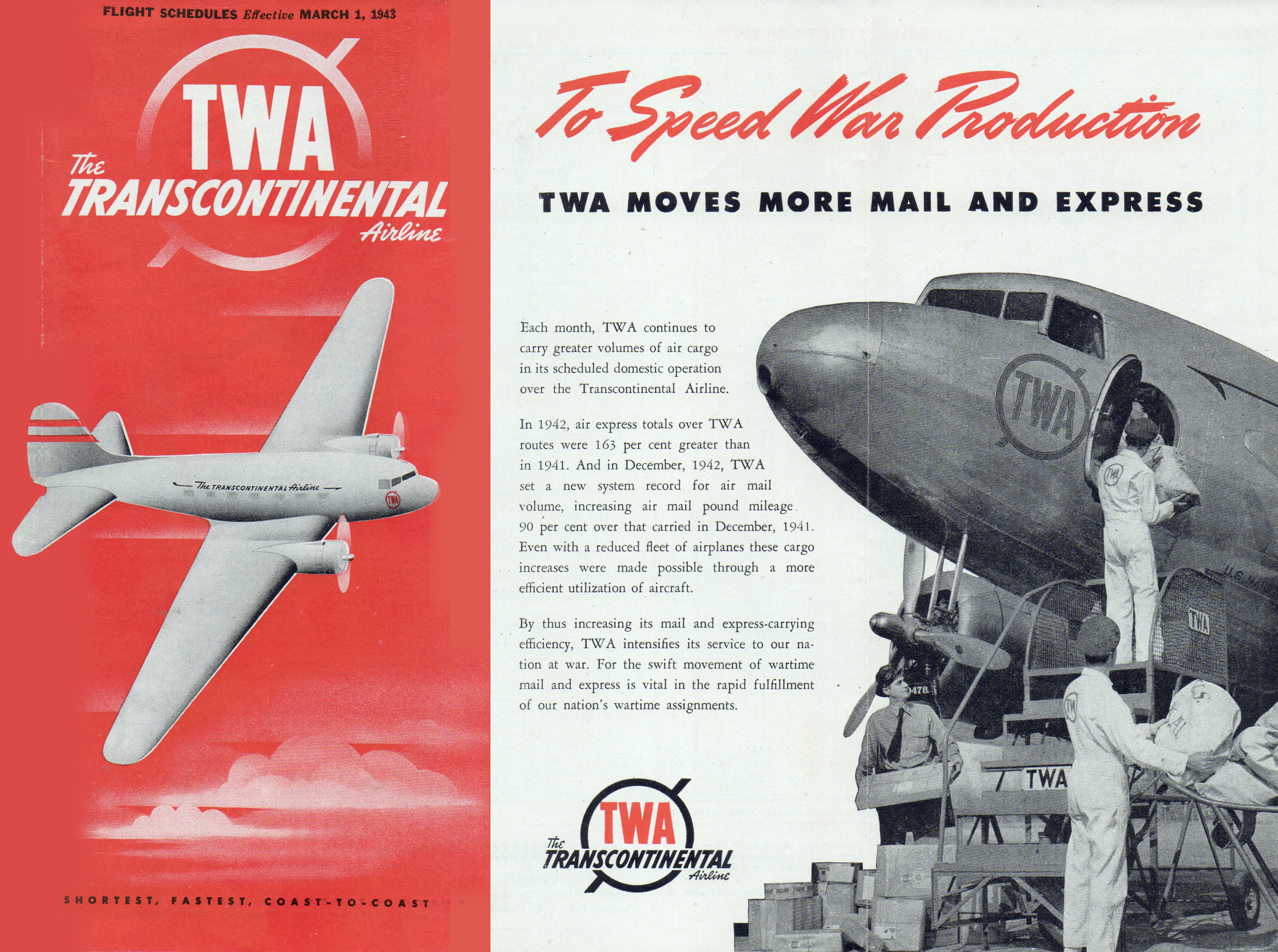
TWA Air Mail & Express service. March, 1943.

On January 29, 1937, TWA contracted with Boeing for five Boeing 307 Stratoliners, which included a pressurized cabin. However, the TWA board refused to authorize the expenditure. Frye then approached another flying enthusiast, Howard Hughes, along with Algur H. Meadows and his business partner Henry W. Peters, to buy stock in 1937. Hughes Tool Company purchased 99,293 shares at $8.25 a share, giving Hughes control, and Noah Dietrich was also placed on the board. Later, Hughes bought another $1,500,000 worth of stock. Paul E. Richter became executive vice president in 1938. A new order for five Stratoliners was placed on September 23, 1939, the first Stratoliner was delivered on May 6, 1940, and TWA initiated coast-to-coast flights on July 8, 1940. The planes could carry 16 night passengers in berths or 33 day passengers. The cabin was pressurized at 12,000 feet, enabling it to fly at an altitude of 20,000 feet, above much of the weather.

=== 1940s ===
==== World War II ====
TWA contracted its five Stratoliners to the Army Air Force's Air Transport Command after Pearl Harbor. Designated as C-75s, they flew 3000 transatlantic flights to Africa and Europe. TWA also contracted to fly its C-54s and Lockheed C-69 Constellations. Hughes and TWA had developed the Constellation in secret with Lockheed, and Hughes purchased 40 for TWA's use in 1939, through his Hughes Tool Company. On April 17, 1944, Hughes and Frye flew the TWA Constellation from Burbank, California, to Washington, D.C., in 6 hours 58 minutes. By the war's end, 20 Constellations had been built.

==== Post-war: The Trans World Airline ====
TWA had 10 Constellations by the end of 1945 and acquired international routes. TWA inaugurated its New York-Paris route on February 5, 1946, with the Star of Paris. The Italy route was initiated on 2 April and then extended to Cairo. Hughes flew the Star of California from Los Angeles to New York on February 15, 1946, in 8 hours and 38 minutes. Hollywood passengers included Cary Grant, Myrna Loy, William Powell, Frank Morgan, Walter Pidgeon, Tyrone Power, Edward G. Robinson. Hence TWA's reputation as the "airline of the stars".

On October 21, 1946, TWA pilots went on strike. The strike finally ended when TWA and the pilots union agreed to binding arbitration on November 15, 1946. Additionally, TWA lost $14.5 million in 1946, owed $4.34 million in short-term debt and $38.9 million in long-term debt. Yet Hughes opposed Frye's financing proposals.

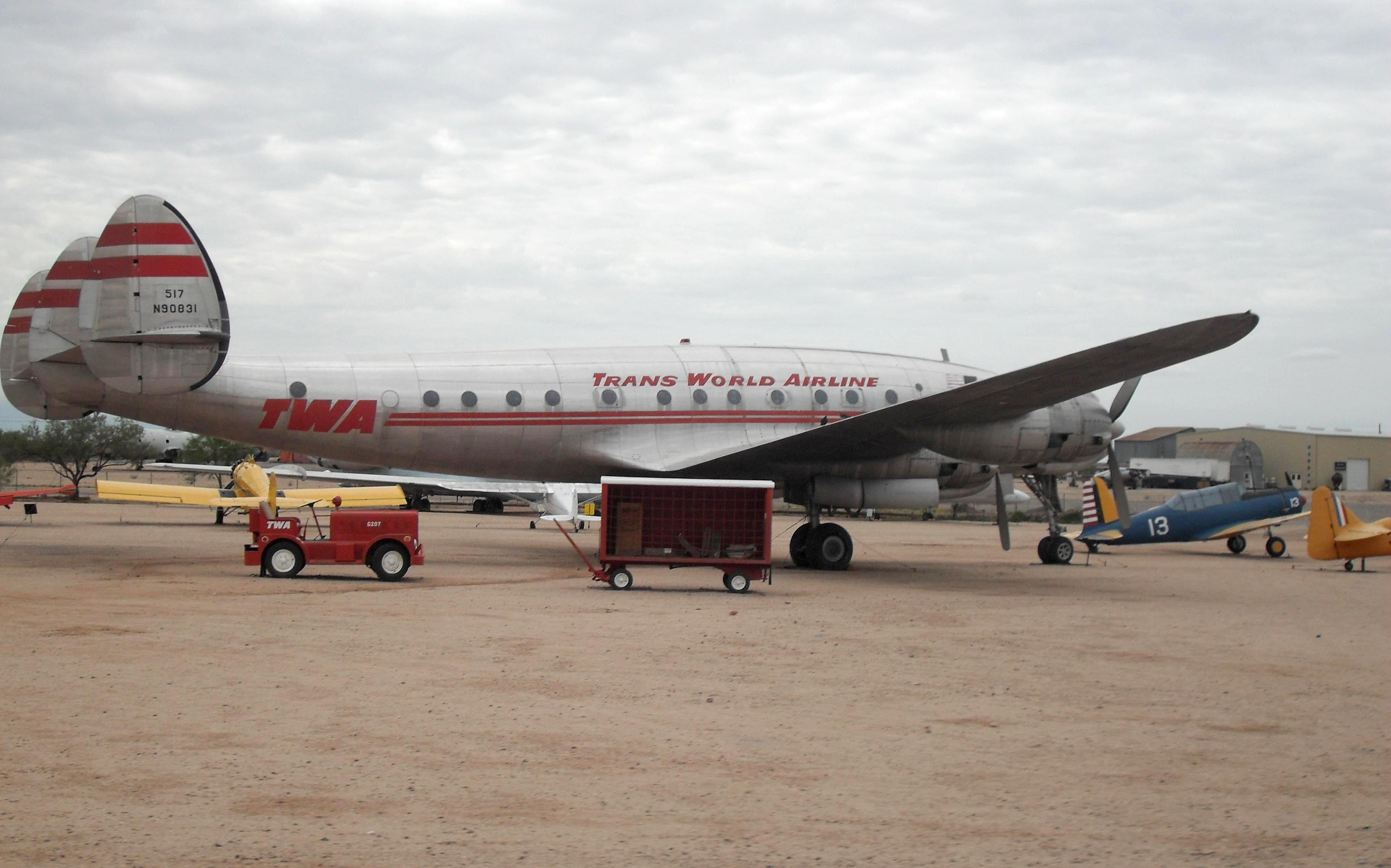
C-69-1-LO / L-049 Constellation, c/n 1970, formerly 42-94549, painted as "Star of Switzerland" of TWA, on display at the Pima Air & Space Museum

==== Falling out between Hughes and Frye ====
Frye and Hughes had a falling out in 1947. Hughes's financial advisor Noah Dietrich wrote that "Frye's inept handling of costs, his inefficient operations, his extravagance with new purchases of equipment, all these factors combined to nosedive the TWA stock from 71 at the war's end to 9 in 1947". The airline was losing $20,000,000 a year, was in danger of not being able to acquire fuel for its planes due to being deeply indebted to oil companies, and the pilot's union went on strike. Hughes provided $10,000,000 worth of financing, which was later converted to 1,039,000 shares, Frye was removed, and Hughes added 11 members to the board, giving him control. Thus ended the era of "The Airline Run by Flyers".

Revenue passenger traffic, in millions of passenger-miles (scheduled flights only, domestic plus international)

Year	Pax-Miles
1951	1875
1955	3477
1960	5490
1965	10225
1970	18599
1975	20957

LaMotte Cohu took over as president, and TWA ordered 12 Lockheed L-749 Constellations on October 18, 1947. Cohu was replaced by Ralph Damon in 1948. As president of American Airlines (AAL), Damon was a proponent of AAL being in the transatlantic market. Damon approved the mergers of AAL and American Export in 1945 to form American Overseas Airlines (AOA). When C.R. Smith sold AOA to Pan American, Damon became disillusioned with AAL. As a consequence, Hughes was able to hire Damon to run TWA. Damon described air transportation as "a race between technology and bankruptcy." Over the next 7 years, Damon introduced practices within the industry that became standard, such as multi-class service with first class and economy class. Damon also brought financial stability by eliminating the company deficit, which was reflected in the stock price rising into the 60s. Carter L. Burgess then took over in 1957, but lasted less than a year, unable to work with Hughes' meddling.

On May 31, 1949, TWA ordered 20 Lockheed 749As. They were operated by TWA for the next 17 years.

=== 1950s: Trans World Airlines ===
On February 22, 1950, TWA signed a contract with the Glenn L. Martin Company for 12 Martin 2-0-2s and 30 Martin 4-0-4s. The first plane was delivered on July 14, 1950. TWA's Martin fleet was eventually increased to 53 planes, and they remained operational until 1961. On May 17, 1950, the airline officially changed its name to Trans World Airlines. On December 5, 1950, TWA ordered 10 Lockheed L-1049 Super Constellations, which were delivered in 1952. On October 19, 1953, TWA offered nonstop transcontinental service.

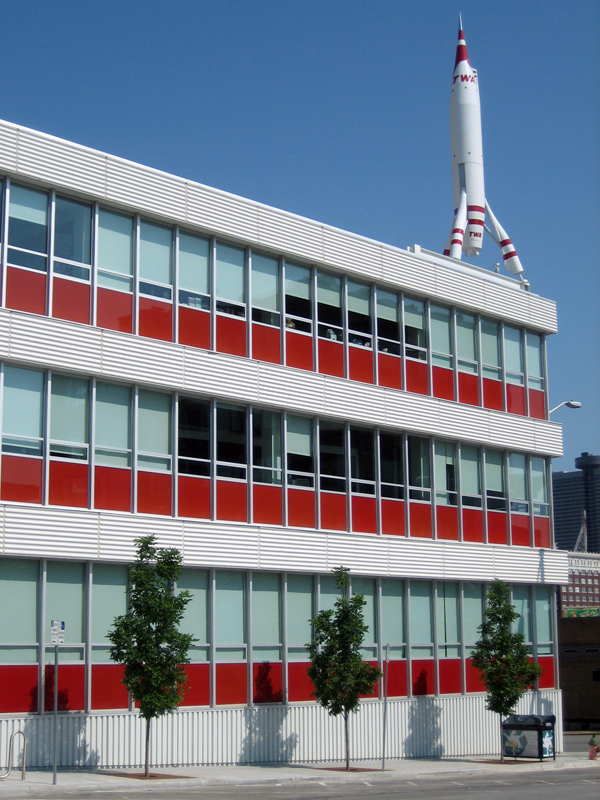
The TWA Corporate Headquarters' Building in Kansas City, Missouri, with TWA Moonliner II atop its southwest corner from 1956–62, replicating the TWA Moonliner Tomorrowland attraction at Disneyland

TWA's flight operations were based at Kansas City Municipal Airport, while their overhaul base was located at Fairfax Airport. When the Great Flood of 1951 destroyed the facility, the city of Kansas City helped TWA build a new facility on 5000 acres, 18 miles (29 km) north of downtown at what became Kansas City International Airport.

On July 10, 1953, TWA ordered 20 Lockheed 1049Es, which was later changed to be 1049Gs. They were put in service on April 1, 1955. On September 25, TWA introduced multiple class services, first and economy. On October 30, they inaugurated their Los Angeles-London route, via New York.

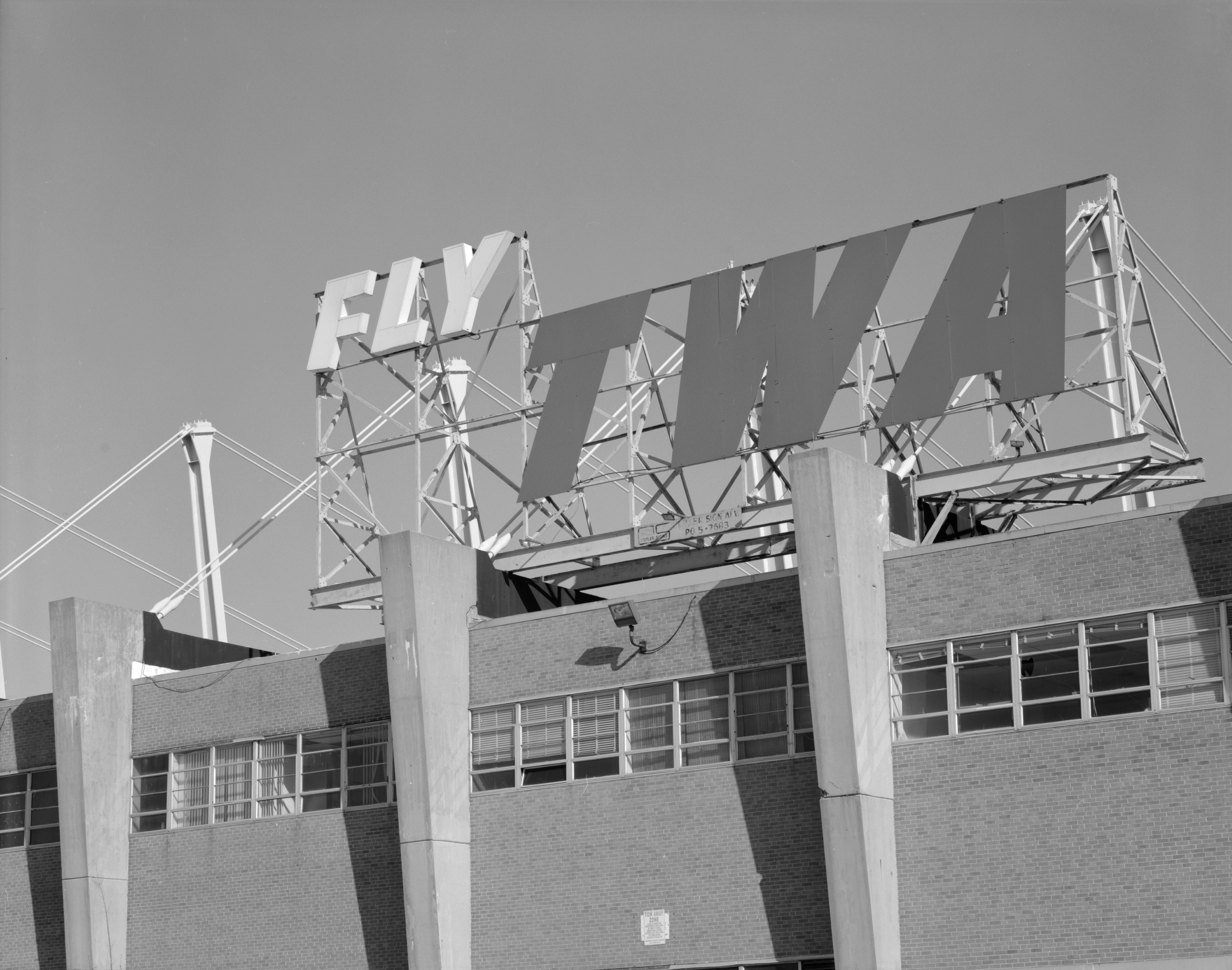
TWA's maintenance hangar at Philadelphia airport, built in 1956, from an undated photo from Historic American Engineering Record

On December 23, 1954, the Hughes Tool Co. ordered 25 Lockheed L-1449 turboprops. On March 29, 1955, this order was changed to piston-powered L-1649As. Hughes transferred the planes to TWA in 1956, after receiving Civil Aeronautics Board approval. The first L-1649A was delivered on May 4, 1957. Fully reclining seats were later added to the airliner.

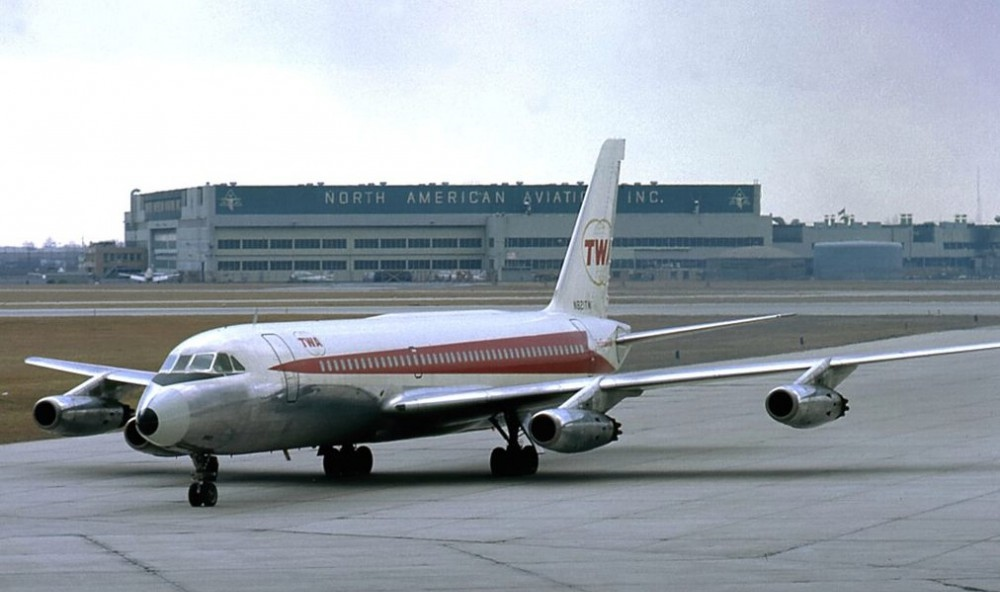
TWA Convair 880

In February 1956, Hughes Tool Co. placed an order with Pratt & Whitney for 300 jet engines, JT-3s and JT-4s. On March 2, 1956, Hughes Tool Co. placed an order for 8 domestic Boeing 707s, later increased to 15 aircraft on January 10, 1957, and an order for 18 international 707s on 19 March 1956, bringing the total order with Boeing to 33 jet planes. Then on June 7, 1956, Hughes placed an order for 30 Convair 880 Skylarks. Hughes wanted the newly ordered Covair's to be made of an aluminum alloy that looked like polished gold with an applied TWA logo in red. They were to be called "Golden Arrows." The plan was later dropped.

TWA suffered from its late entry to the jet age, and Hughes' 1956 order cost $497 million. The transaction ultimately resulted in Hughes losing control of the airline.

In 1958, TWA became the first major airline to hire an African American flight attendant, hiring Margaret Grant after another African American woman, Dorothy Franklin of Astoria, Queens, New York, filed a lawsuit alleging "that she had been discriminated against 'because of poor complexion ... unattractive teeth' and legs that were 'not shapely'". New York governor W. Averell Harriman praised her hiring, saying the action "would raise American prestige abroad".

Charles Sparks Thomas became president on July 2, 1958. The inaugural flight of TWA's Boeing 707 took place on March 20, 1959.

=== 1960s ===
In 1961, TWA introduced in-flight movies. In 1962, TWA started using Doppler radar on its international flights.

==== Charles C. Tillinghast Jr. ====
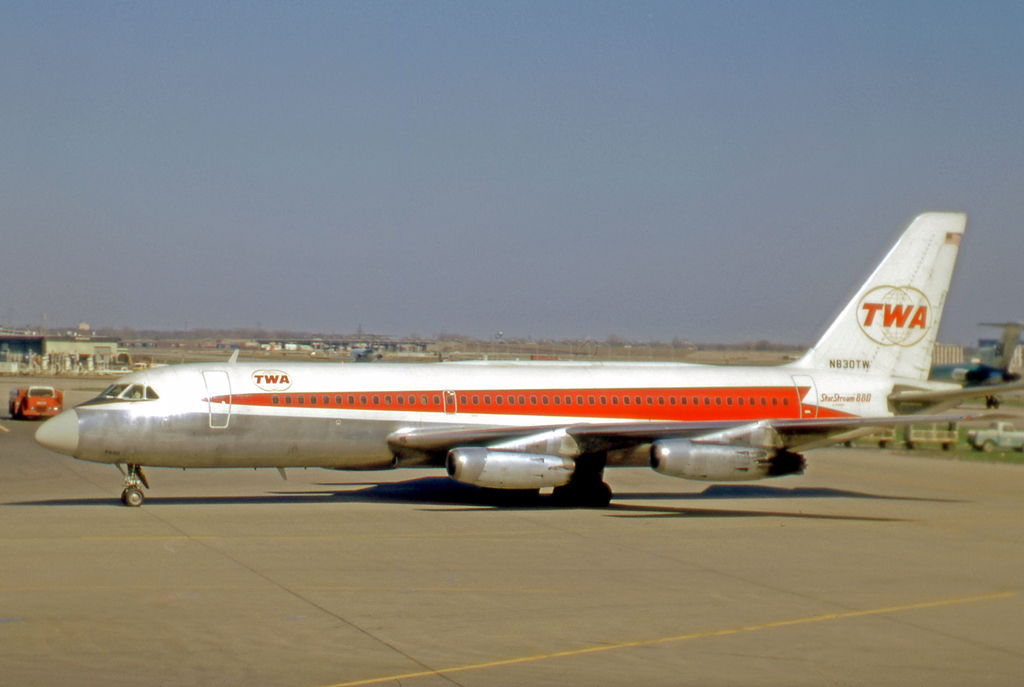
TWA added the Convair 880 jet airliner to its US-based fleet beginning in 1960.

In 1960, Hughes relinquished control of the airline, as the major stockholder, through the financial terms associated with the jet purchase. As a consequence of that deal, Charles C. Tillinghast Jr. took over as president. The battle over Hughes' control continued in court until 1966 when Hughes was forced to sell his stock. That sale brought Hughes $546,549,771.

Under a plan put together by Dillon, Read & Co., a $165 million loan was raised to fund a 45-jet fleet. The deal was signed on December 30, 1960 by Hughes' lawyer Raymond Holliday, who constituted one member of a three-person voting trust, with the other two members, Ernest R. Breech and Irving S. Olds, represented the financing institutions. On June 30, 1961, TWA filed a federal suit against Hughes, Hughes Tool Co., and Raymond Holliday. Then on April 18, 1962, TWA filed a Delaware suit against Hughes and Hughes Tool Co. On January 10, 1973, the U.S. Supreme Court ruled against TWA in the federal case. However, on May 15, 1986, Delaware ruled in favor of TWA for the state case, eventually awarding TWA $48,346,000.

TWA started operating its Convair 880s on January 12, 1961 but would report a net loss of $38.7 million for 1961. TWA reported a net profit of $19.8 million in 1963, $37 million in 1964, and $50.1 million in 1965. TWA stock went from $7.5 per share in 1962 to $62 in 1965.

Under new management, the Trans World Corporation (TWA's holding company) expanded to purchase Hilton Hotels, Hardee's, Canteen Corp., and Century 21 Realty. Employment grew to nearly 10,000 employees. In 1964, TWA started a program to assist in the United States export expansion effort that became known as the TWA MarketAir Corporate Logo to promote business passenger air travel and as a marketing tool to be used in air cargo sales. This marketing effort was initiated by the Senior Vice President, of Marketing, Thomas B. McFadden, in collaboration with the Bureau of International Commerce, important U.S. financial institutions, and export expansion entities to offer tools that small and medium-sized U.S. companies could use at low or no cost to expand their exports. Staff management of this program was under the direction of Joseph S. Cooper. A key element of this program was the MarketAir Newsletter in a number of languages targeted to American exporters and international travellers.

In 1964, TWA opened its New York office.

==== Revolutionary airport design ====
TWA was one of the first airlines, after Delta Air Lines, to embrace the spoke-hub distribution paradigm and was one of the first with the Boeing 747. It planned to use the 747 along with the supersonic transport to fly people between the West/Midwest (via Kansas City) and New York City (via John F. Kennedy International Airport) to Europe and other world destinations.

===== John F. Kennedy International Airport =====
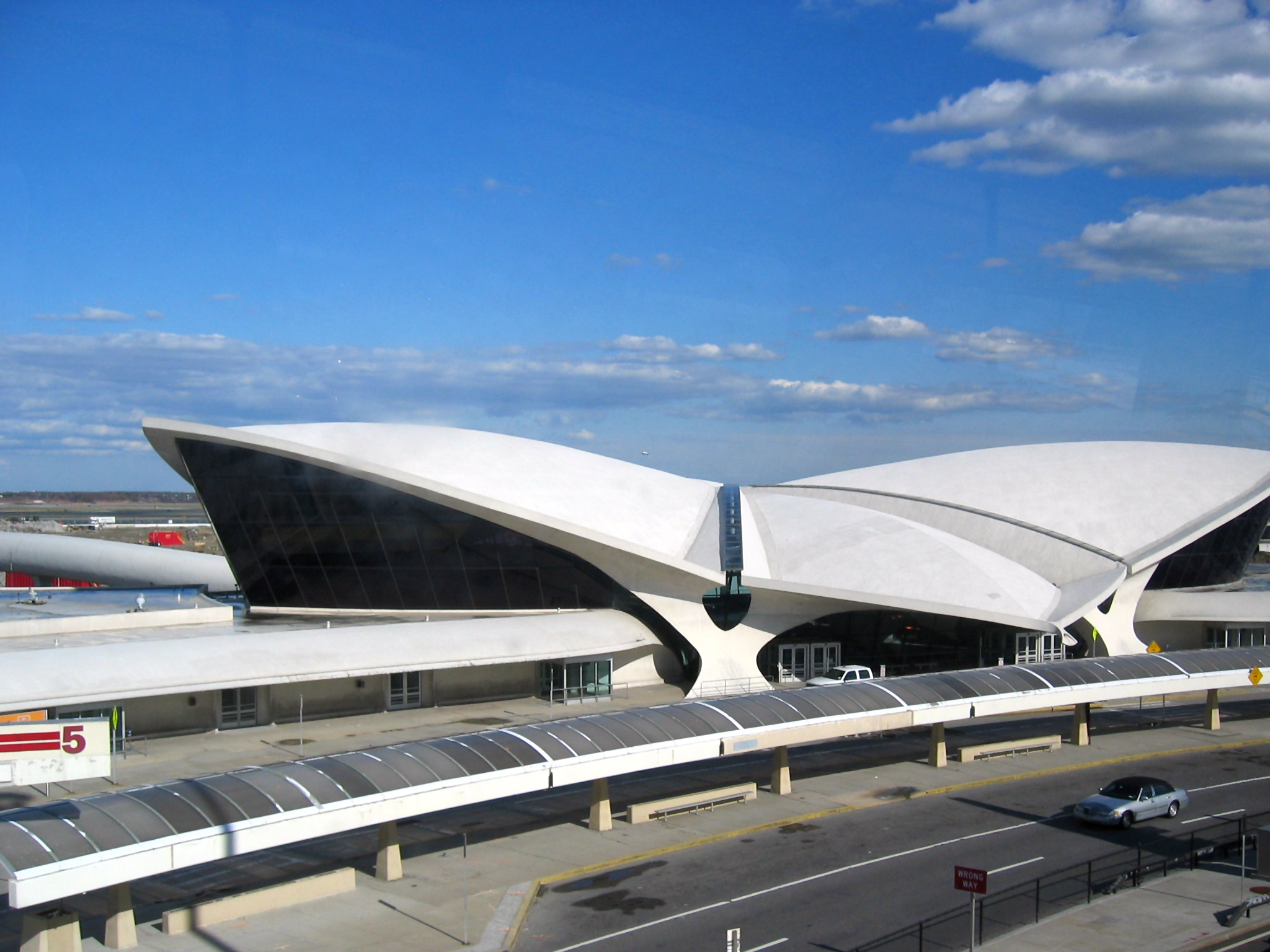
The Trans World Flight Center at John F. Kennedy International Airport in New York

In 1962, TWA opened Trans World Flight Center, now Terminal 5 (or simply T5), at New York City's JFK Airport and designed by Eero Saarinen. The terminal was expanded in 1969 to accommodate jumbo jets, went dormant in 2001, and underwent renovation and expansion beginning in 2005. A new terminal with a crescent-shaped entry hall and now serving JetBlue opened in 2008—partially encircling the landmark. The headhouse was renovated by Morse Development along with MCR and turned into the TWA Hotel which opened on May 15, 2019.

===== Kansas City International Airport =====
Kansas City approved a $150 million bond issue for the TWA hub there. Following union strife, the airport ultimately cost $250 million when it opened in 1972, with Vice President Spiro Agnew officiating. TWA took the lead in the airport's "drive to gate" design that placed gates within 100 feet (30 m) of the street. The Southern Airways Flight 49 hijacking resulted in the FAA enacting security screening requirements only 26 days after the new airport had opened; the terminals were not deep enough to allow passenger amenities such as concessions and restrooms inside the secured area, rendering the new hub obsolete almost immediately after its opening. After airline deregulation, TWA moved its mid-continent hub to Lambert International Airport in St. Louis, but kept a maintenance base at Kansas City.

==== All-jet fleet ====
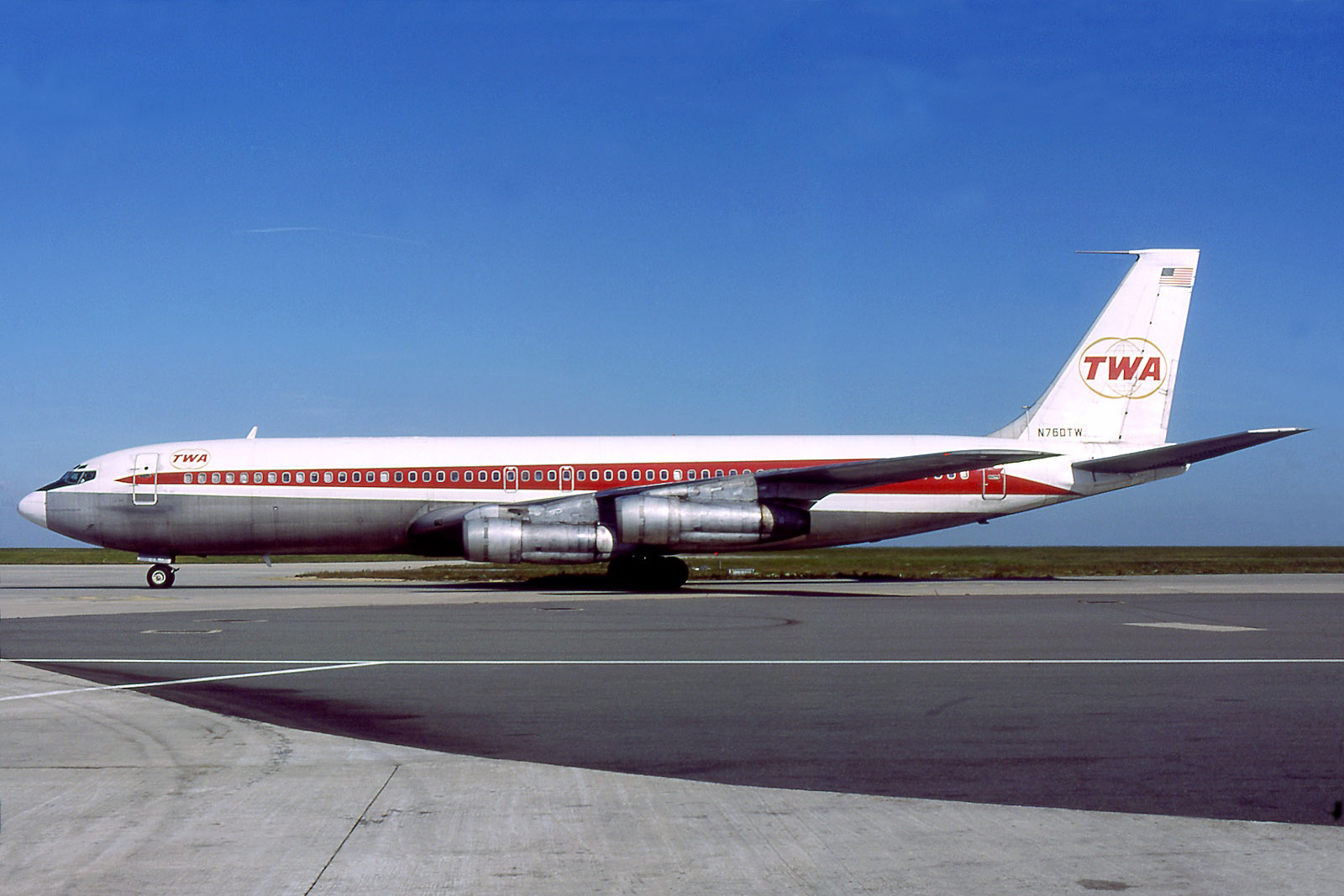
TWA operated Boeing 707 single-aisle jets in the 1960s.

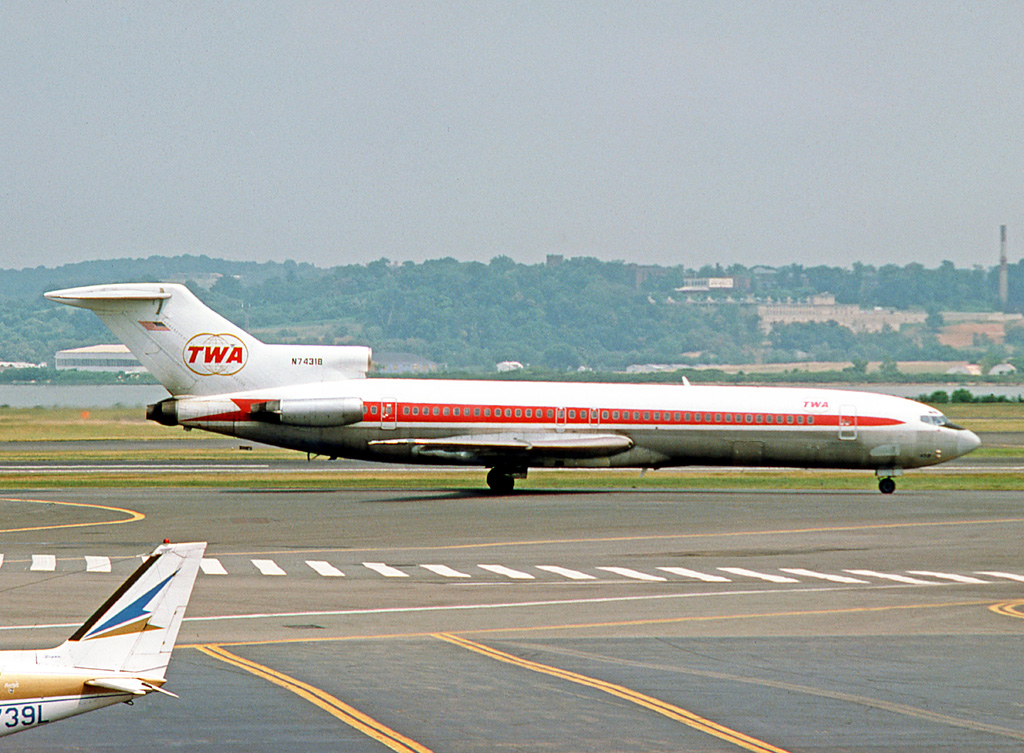
TWA operated nearly 100 Boeing 727 trijets on their US domestic routes between 1964 and closure of operations.

On April 7, 1967, TWA became one of the first all-jet airlines in the USA with the retirement of their last Lockheed L-749A Constellation and L-1649 Starliner cargo aircraft. That morning aircraft ground-service personnel placed a booklet on every passenger seat throughout the TWA system titled "Props Are For Boats".

Between 1967–72, TWA was the world's third-largest airline by passenger miles, behind Aeroflot and United. During the mid and late 1960s, the airline extended its reach as far east as Hong Kong from Europe and also introduced service to several destinations in Africa. In 1969, TWA carried the most transatlantic passengers of any airline; until then, Pan American World Airways had always been number one. In the Transpacific Route Case of 1969, TWA was given authority to fly across the Pacific to Hawaii and Taiwan, and for a few years, TWA had a round-the-world network.

In 1969, TWA opened the Breech Academy on a 25-acre (100,000 m^{2}) campus in the Kansas City suburb of Overland Park, Kansas to train its flight attendants, ticket agents, and travel agents, as well as to provide flight simulators for its pilots. It became the definitive airline facility, training other airlines' staff, as well as its own.

The airline continued to expand European operations in the 1960s, 1970s, and 1980s. In 1987, TWA had a transatlantic system reaching from Los Angeles to Bombay, including virtually every major European population center, with 10 American gateways.

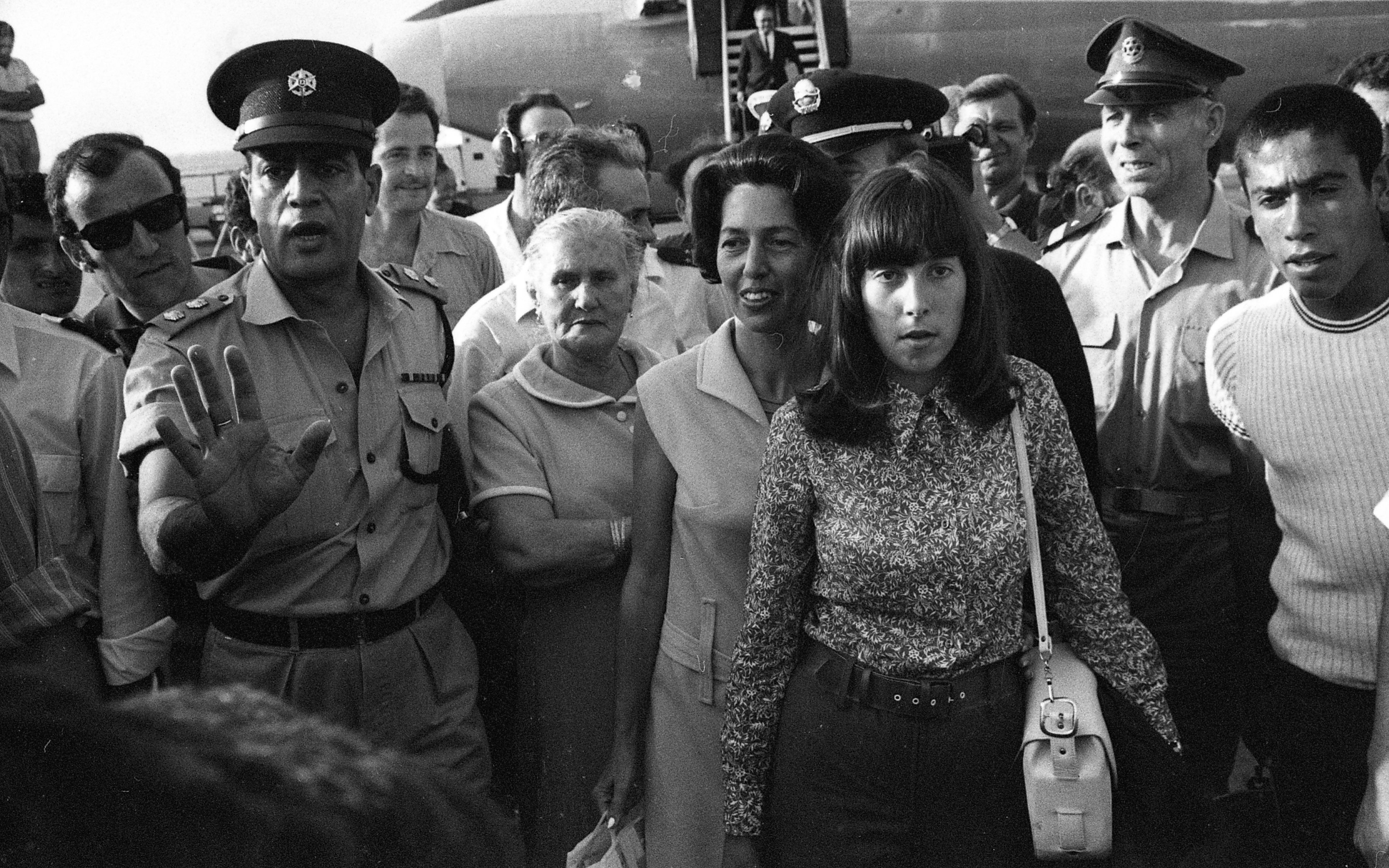
A TWA passenger airplane was hijacked and forced to land unexpectedly in Damascus, Syria. The Israeli passengers were arrested but were released after several days.

=== 1970s ===
TWA introduced the Boeing 747 to its fleet in 1970. After the merger with Hilton International in 1967, TWA's holding company, Trans World Corp., continued to diversify, buying Canteen Corp. in 1973, and then the Hardee's restaurant franchises. Financial woes in the 1970s included a flight attendants' strike, higher fuel prices after the Arab Oil Embargo, and airline deregulation. During the early 1970s, the aviation industry faced significant challenges due to a severe economic downturn. TWA, in particular, had difficulties as their Boeing 747s and Lockheed L-1011s flew with very low passenger numbers. TWA had originally purchased these planes not because they needed them for their operations, but rather because Pan Am had ordered a large number of them. Consequently, TWA had to manage excess capacity with a fleet of oversized planes that exceeded their actual requirements. By 1975, the financial obligations of some payrolls could only be fulfilled by promptly selling six Boeing 747 aircraft to the Iranian Air Force. The financial deal involving TWA, in which the jetliners were sold for around one-sixth of their true value, was regrettable. However, the airline was in a state of desperation for immediate liquidity. TWA was experiencing financial losses on its trans-Pacific route which was part of its around the world route network during the early 1970s. In a significant milestone, TWA's network expanded globally for the first time in its corporate history. However, this achievement would be short-lived as subsequent events led to its eventual termination.

In 1975, Trans World Airlines was headquartered in Turtle Bay, in Midtown Manhattan.

The uniforms for the flight attendants during this decade went through three different designers. From 1971–1974, the official TWA uniform was designed by Valentino. From 1974–1978, the official TWA uniform was designed by Stan Herman, and from 1978–2001, the official TWA uniform was designed by Ralph Lauren.

=== 1980s ===
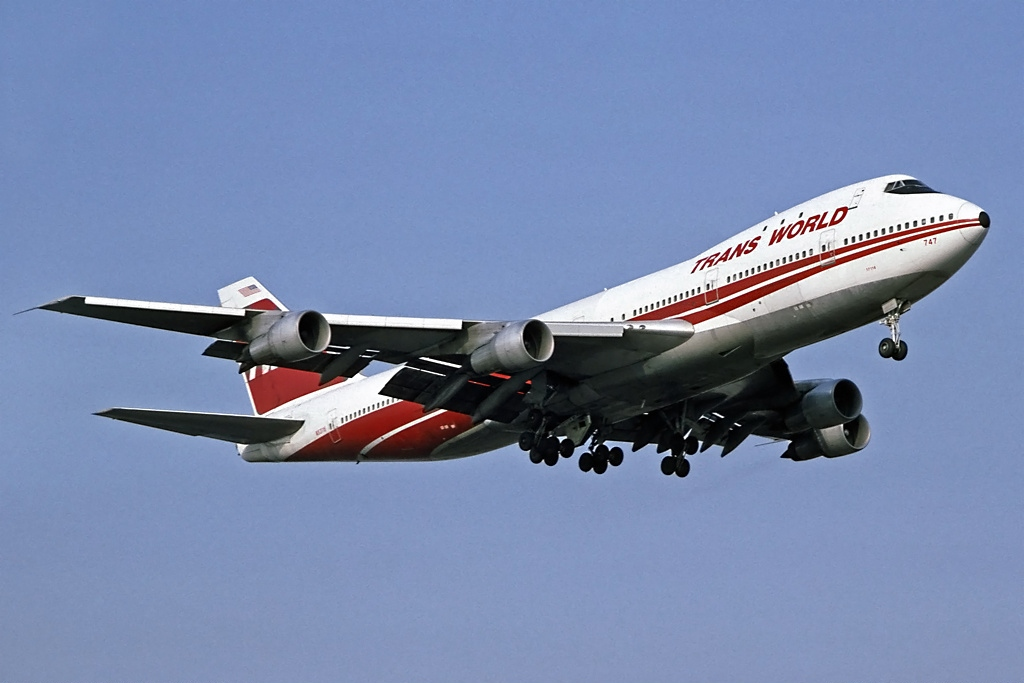
TWA Boeing 747-100 at Heathrow Airport in 1983

Facing the pressures of deregulation, the airline consolidated its route system around a domestic hub in St. Louis, aided by its purchase of Ozark Air Lines in 1986, and an international gateway in New York. It was able to remain profitable during this time because of its good route positioning and the relatively low costs of adapting its operations.

In 1983, Trans World Corporation spun off the airline. In 1985, TWA's board agreed to sell the airline to Frank Lorenzo's Texas Air Corporation. Due to Texas Air's ownership of non-union carriers Continental Airlines and New York Air, as well as Lorenzo's reputation of being a 'union buster', TWA's unions objected to the sale, and instead supported a takeover deal from Carl Icahn by offering concessions on condition that Icahn's deal be accepted by the board. Directors subsequently agreed, and the Texas Air deal was scrapped. Following the sale, Icahn appointed himself as chairman of the airline.

Also in 1985, TWA closed its hub at Pittsburgh International Airport after nearly 20 years as a hub. The following year, TWA acquired Ozark Air Lines, a regional carrier based at Lambert-St. Louis International Airport, for $250 million. This transaction increased TWA's share of enplanements in St. Louis from 56.6% to 82%.

TWA had pilot bases in many European cities such as Berlin, Frankfurt, Zürich, Rome, and Athens. These bases were used to provide crews for the Boeing 727s which TWA operated in its European route network. Its Boeing 727 aircraft served Cairo, Athens, Rome, London, Paris, Geneva, Berlin, Frankfurt, Hamburg, Stuttgart, Zürich, Amsterdam, Oslo, Vienna, and Istanbul.

In 1987, Icahn moved the company's main offices from Manhattan to office buildings he owned in Mount Kisco.

TWA earned a profit of $106.2 million in 1987. In September 1988, TWA stockholders approved a plan to take the company private, winning Icahn $469 million in personal profit, but adding $539.7 million in debt to TWA.

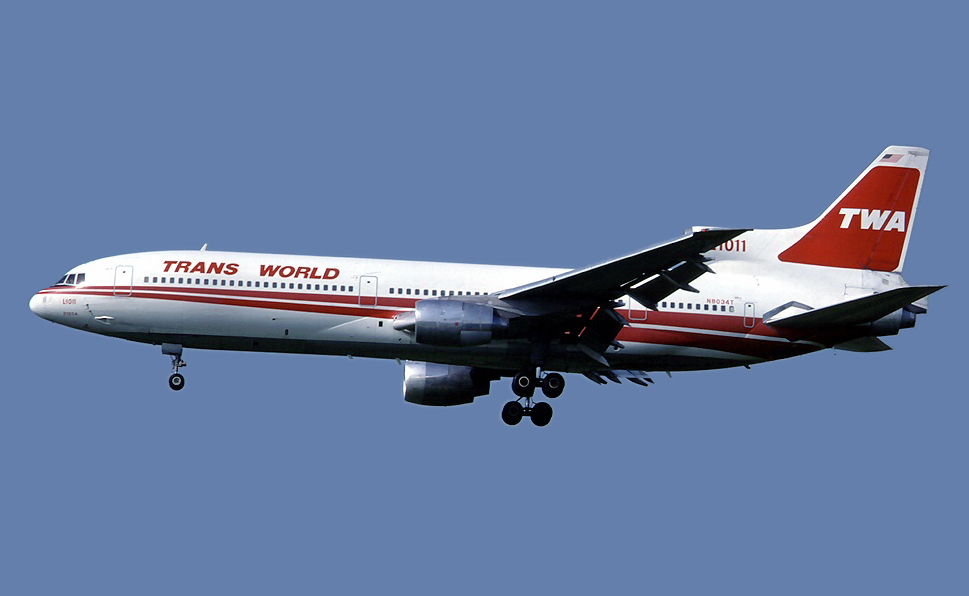
TWA operated the L-1011 TriStar wide-body jetliner

TWA's zenith as an international carrier occurred in the summer of 1988, when, for the only time, the airline carried more than 50 percent of all transatlantic passengers. Every day, Boeing 747, Lockheed L-1011, and Boeing 767 aircraft departed to more than 30 cities in Europe, fed by a small but effective domestic operation focused on moving U.S. passengers to New York or other gateway cities for wide-body service across the Atlantic, while a similar inter-European operation shuttled non-U.S. passengers to TWA's European gateways—London, Paris (which was even considered a European hub by TWA), and Frankfurt—for travel to the United States.

In 1989, TWA decided to replace its fleet of Boeing 727 Series 100 aircraft with the former Ozark Airlines DC-9s. This decision was based on the economics of operating three-crew airplanes (727s) with three engines, versus operating two-crew airplanes (DC-9s) with two engines. Both airplanes had about the same passenger and cargo capacity, so it was decided to replace the Boeing fleet. To prepare for this transition, TWA positioned several million dollars' worth of spare parts for the DC-9s in Germany. This was a requirement dictated by the German government. If TWA wanted to use DC-9s in the service of the German population, then TWA had to provide readily available spare parts for its fleet. The airline also sent its senior DC-9 pilots (known as Check Airmen) to Europe to observe the operations in preparation for the changeover of the crews that were to follow. Shortly before the DC-9 airplanes began arriving in Germany, however, the entire plan was cancelled because the leasing contracts that Carl Icahn had created for the former Ozark DC-9s specifically forbade any operations outside the continental limits of the United States.

=== 1990s ===
In 1990, Icahn's pressing need for additional capital forced him to sell the airline's Heathrow operations to American Airlines about the same time that Pan American World Airways sold its Heathrow operation to United.

==== 1992 bankruptcy ====
Tillinghast's analysis overlooked the possible implications of the transpacific industry and the specialized air freight market. Based on available reports, there are allegations that he purportedly articulated the perspective that the Pacific area and the freight business exhibit a deficiency in financial performance. The primary aim of their endeavor was to diminish the scale of the airline to achieve financial sustainability.

Airline deregulation hit TWA hard in the 1980s. TWA had badly neglected domestic U.S. expansion at a time when the newly deregulated domestic market was growing quickly. TWA's holding company, Trans World Corporation, spun off the airline, which then became starved for capital. The airline briefly considered selling itself to renowned corporate raider Frank Lorenzo in the 1980s, but ended up selling to yet another corporate raider, Carl Icahn, in 1985. Under Icahn's direction, many of its most profitable assets were sold to competitors, much to the detriment of TWA. Icahn was eventually ousted in 1993, though not before the airline was forced to file for bankruptcy on January 31, 1992.

Negotiations continued until a deal was reached on August 24, 1992. In that deal, Icahn had to pay TWA $150 million, the employees reduced compensation by 15% over the next three years, and the creditors forgave $1 billion in debt. When TWA emerged from bankruptcy in Nov. 1993, employees owned 45% of the company. Jeffrey H. Erickson took over as president in 1994, moved its headquarters to St. Louis, and sponsored the Trans World Dome. The airline had announced plans to move the headquarters to St. Louis in 1993.

==== 1995 bankruptcy ====
When Carl Icahn left in 1993, he arranged to have TWA give Karabu Corp., an entity he controlled, the rights to buy TWA tickets at 45% off published fares through September 2003. This was named "the Karabu deal". The ticket program agreement, which began on June 14, 1995, excluded tickets for travel which originated or terminated in St. Louis, Missouri. Tickets were subject to TWA's normal seat assignment and boarding pass rules and regulations - they were not assignable to any other carrier and were not endorsable. No commissions were paid to Karabu by TWA for tickets sold under the ticket program agreement.

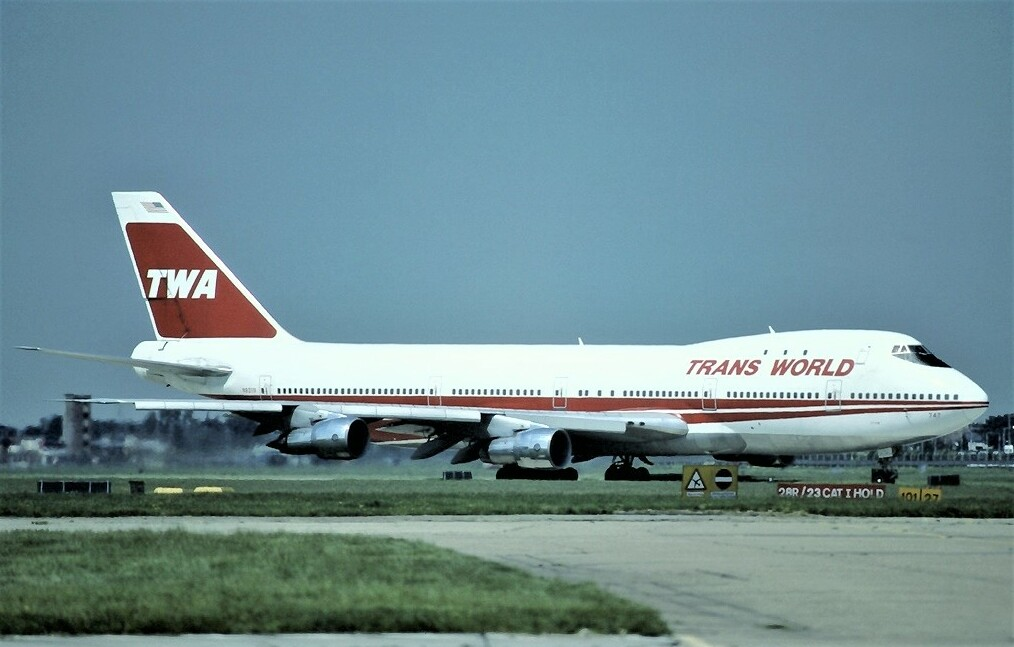
In its heyday, TWA operated a large fleet of Boeing 747 aircraft. This aircraft, N93119, would later explode mid-air as TWA Flight 800.

By agreement dated August 14, 1995, Lowestfare.com LLC, a wholly owned operating subsidiary of Karabu, was joined as a party to the ticket program agreement. Pursuant to the ticket program agreement, Lowestfare.com could purchase an unlimited number of system tickets. System tickets are tickets for all applicable classes of service which were purchased by Karabu from TWA at a 45% discount from TWA's published fare. In addition to system tickets, Lowestfare.com could also purchase domestic consolidator tickets, which are tickets issued at bulk fare rates and were limited to specified origin/destination city markets and did not permit the holder to modify or refund a purchased ticket. Karabu's purchase of domestic consolidator tickets was subject to a cap of $70 million per year based on the full retail price of the tickets.

On most TWA flights, Karabu could buy at a heavy discount and then sell a certain portion of all TWA's available seats. As a result, TWA was hamstrung by the high proportion of heavily discounted seats that had been sold and was essentially left with no control over its pricing. It could not afford to discount any of its seats, and if TWA wanted to increase revenue on busy routes by putting a larger plane into service, Karabu would only claim more seats. TWA was losing an estimated $150 million a year in revenue due to this deal.

To ameliorate the Karabu deal, TWA entered and exited bankruptcy in 1995.

TWA entered its second bankruptcy on June 30, 1995. When TWA emerged in August 1995, employee ownership was reduced to 30%, but the company was relieved of $0.5 billion of its $1.8 billion debt.

==== Short turn-around ====
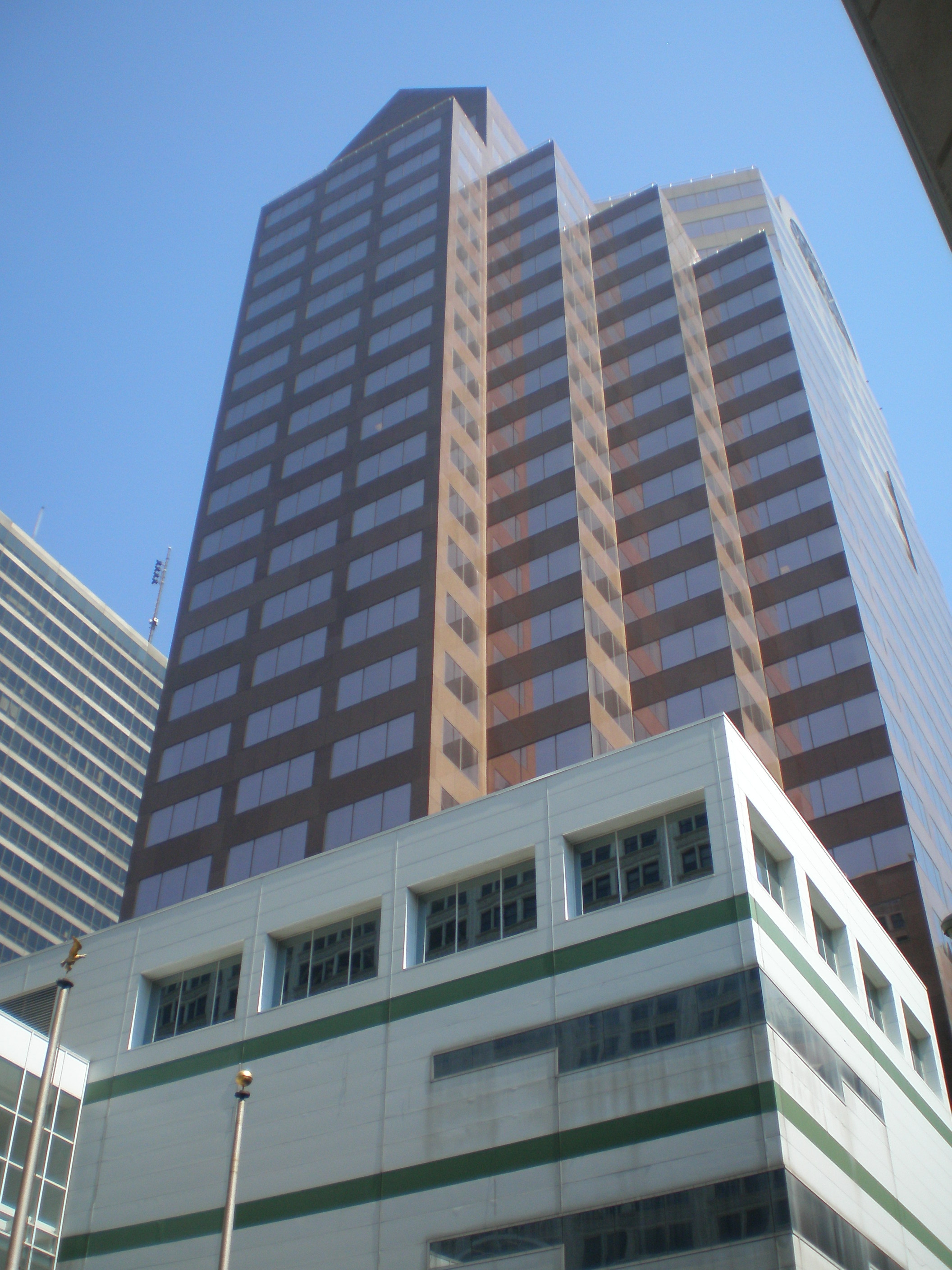
One City Centre in downtown St. Louis, which at one time served as the headquarters of TWA

By 1998, TWA had reorganized as a primarily domestic carrier, with routes centered on hubs in St. Louis and New York. Partly in response to TWA Flight 800 and the age of its fleet, TWA announced a major fleet renewal, ordering 125 new aircraft. TWA paid for naming rights for the new Trans World Dome, home of the then St. Louis Rams, in its corporate hometown. In June 1994, its headquarters moved to One City Centre in downtown St. Louis.

TWA's fleet-renewal program included adding newer and smaller, more fuel-efficient, longer-range aircraft such as the Boeing 757 and 767 and short-range aircraft such as the McDonnell Douglas MD-80 and Boeing 717. Aircraft such as the Boeing 727 and 747, along with the Lockheed L-1011 and older DC-9s, some from Ozark and the 1960s, were retired.

TWA had international code-share agreements with Royal Jordanian Airlines, Kuwait Airways, Royal Air Maroc, Air Europa, and Air Malta. In 1997, a code-share agreement was signed with Air Ukraine with plans to begin service between Paris and Kyiv by 1999. Domestic code-share with America West Airlines was started, with long-term plans for a merger considered.

The airlines' routes were also changed; several international destinations were dropped or changed. The focus of the airline became domestic with a few international routes through its St. Louis hub and smaller New York (JFK) and San Juan, Puerto Rico hubs. Domestically, the carrier improved services with redesigned aircraft and new services, including "Pay in Coach, Fly in First", whereby coach passengers could be upgraded to first class when flying through St. Louis. Internationally, services were cut. European destinations eventually were limited to London and Paris; and in the Middle East, to Cairo, Riyadh and Tel Aviv.

=== 2000s ===
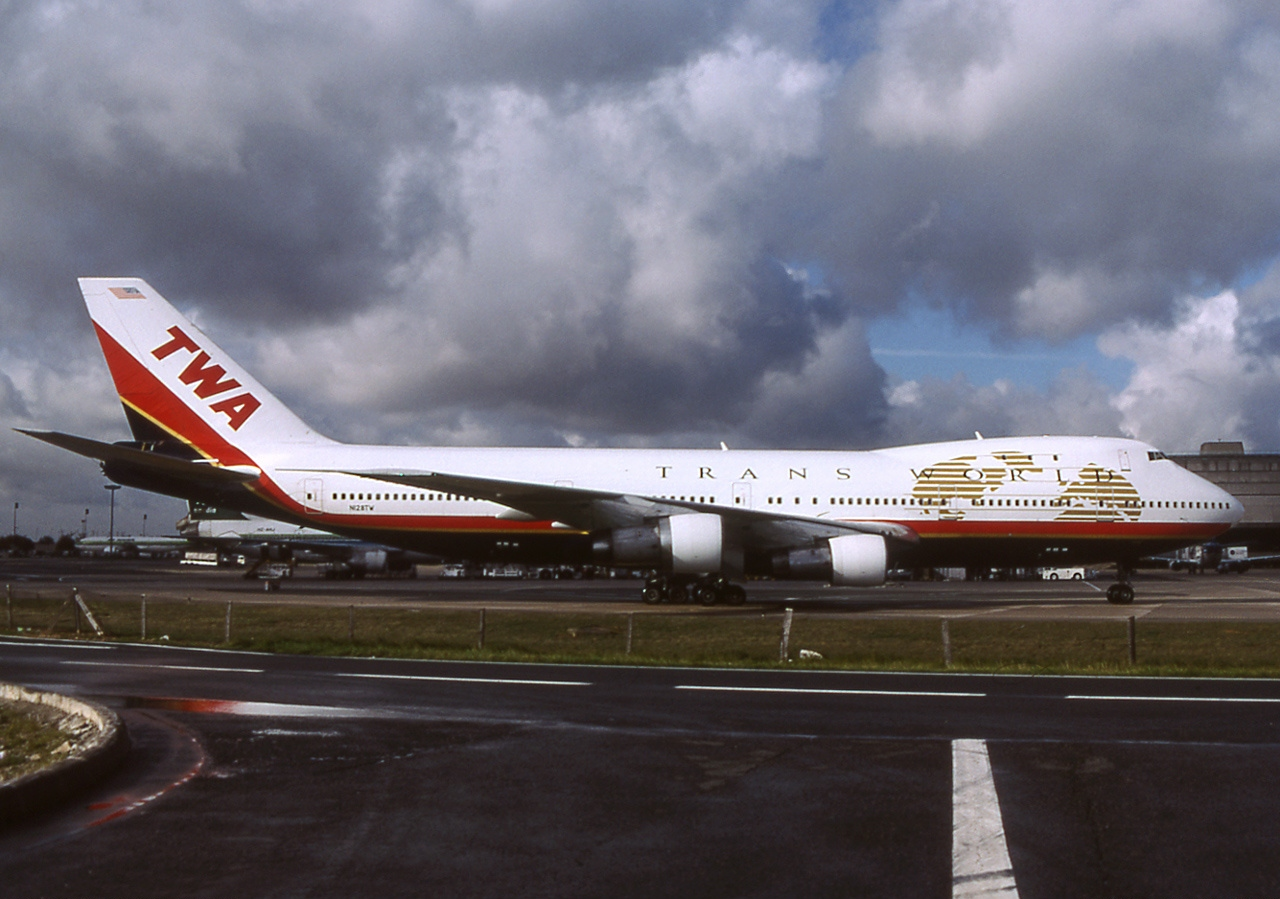
Boeing 747-143 N128TW wearing the airline’s final livery before acquisition by American Airlines

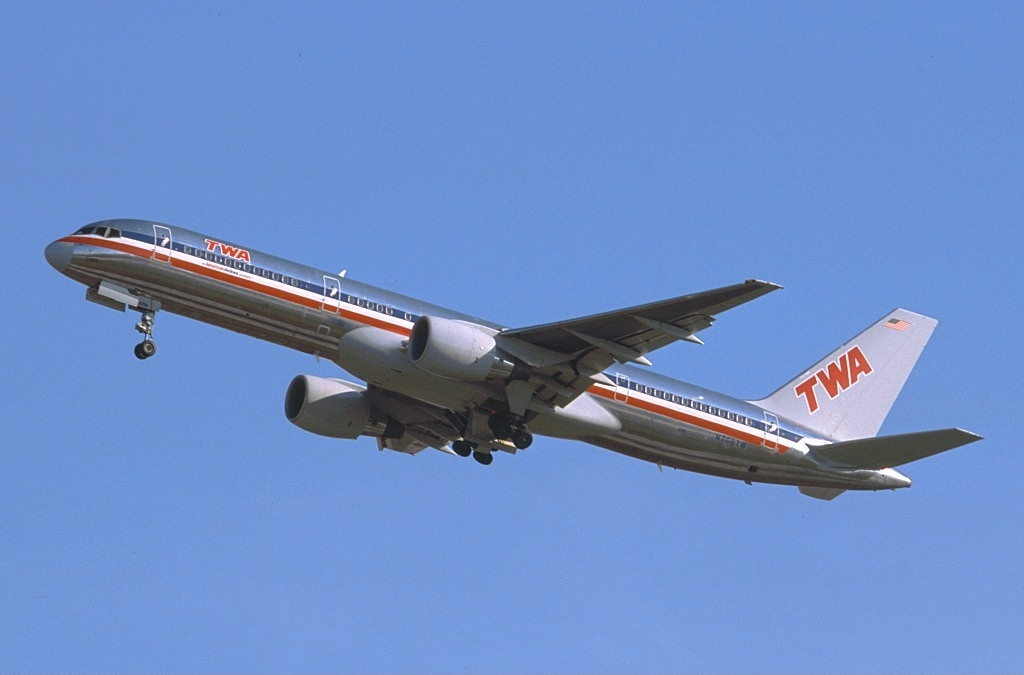
A TWA 757-231 in an AA/TWA Hybrid livery to promote their merger

TWA stated that it planned to make Los Angeles a focus city around October 2000, with a partnership with American Eagle Airlines as part of Trans World Connection.

==== Acquisition by American Airlines ====
Financial problems soon resurfaced and Trans World Airlines Inc. assets were acquired in April 2001 by AMR Corp., the parent company of American Airlines, which quickly formed a new company called TWA Airlines LLC. As part of the deal, TWA declared Chapter 11 bankruptcy (for the third time) the day after it agreed to the purchase. The terms of the deal included a $745 million payment. The bankruptcy court approved the purchase over a rival bid by Jet Acquisition Group, an investment group fronted by Ralph Atkin, founder of SkyWest Airlines. The total value of TWA's assets and assumed liabilities was estimated to be $2 billion. American did not claim the naming rights for the Rams' home, which eventually became the Edward Jones Dome and later The Dome at America's Center.

TWA booking ended on November 30, 2001.

TWA Airlines LLC flew its last flight on December 1, 2001, with an MD-83 aircraft painted in a special inverted livery named "Wings of Pride" (N948TW). The ceremonial last flight was Flight 220 from Kansas City to St. Louis, with CEO Captain William Compton at the controls. The final flight before TWA was 'officially' absorbed by American Airlines was completed between St. Louis and Las Vegas, Nevada, also on December 1, 2001. At 10:00 pm CST on that date, employees began removing all TWA signs and placards from airports around the country, replacing them with American Airlines signs. At midnight, all TWA flights officially became listed as American Airlines flights. Some aircraft carried hybrid American/TWA livery during the transition, with American's tricolor stripe on the fuselage and TWA titles on the tail and forward fuselage.

American Airlines acquired some Ambassadors Clubs; other Ambassadors Clubs closed on December 2, 2001.

TWA's St. Louis hub shrank after the acquisition, due to its proximity to American's larger hub at Chicago's O'Hare International Airport. As a result, American initially replaced TWA's St. Louis mainline hub with regional jet service (going from over 800 operations a day to just over 200) and downsized TWA's maintenance base in Kansas City. In September 2009, American Airlines announced its intent to shut down the St. Louis hub it inherited from TWA and, in October 2009, American Airlines announced its intent to close the Kansas City maintenance base by September 2010.

== Logo and design ==
The red TWA logo was developed in the 1950s with the red and white color scheme developed by Howard Hughes. In the 1960s, Raymond Loewy, legendary industrial designer, created the dynamic red arrow on white that ran the length of the fuselage. The red arrow lasted well into the 1970s.

In 1962, Loewy updated the corporate logo which had consisted of bold, purely typographic red italic letters. He kept the letters but added a double globe in yellow. The new logo was used for a majority of TWA's purposes until 1975, when the purely red typographic logo of red letters was reintroduced.

The red and white color scheme developed by Hughes was a central part of the airline's identity and lasted until it was acquired by American Airlines in 2001.

== Ongoing heritage ==
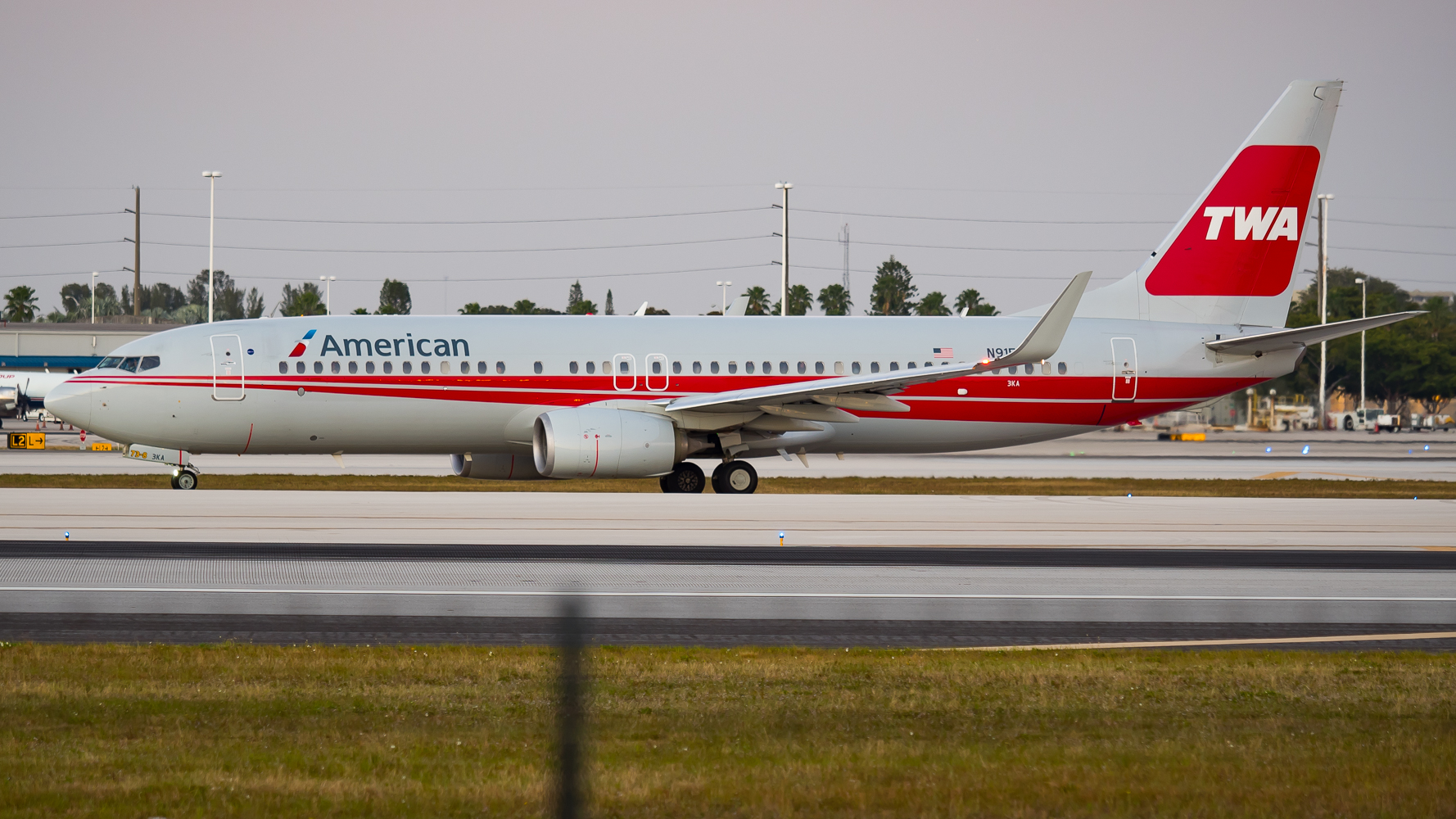
The American Airlines Boeing 737-800 in TWA heritage livery (registered N915NN) is shown here taxiing to the American Airlines terminal at Miami International Airport in February 2017, more than 15 years after TWA ceased all operations and flights.

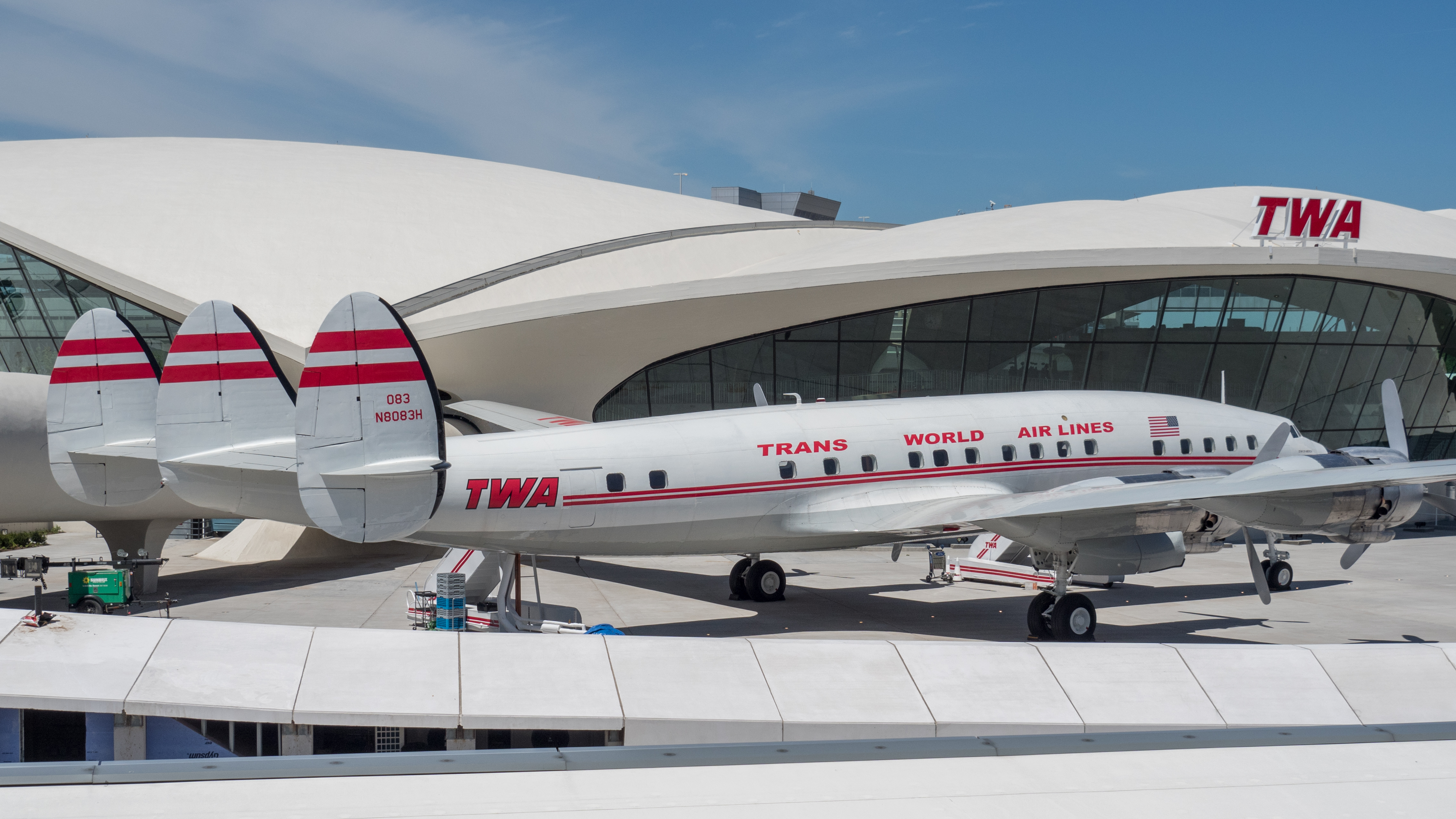
A Lockheed Constellation L-1649 Starliner in TWA livery, seen here parked at the TWA Hotel, which occupies the restored TWA Flight Center

On December 16, 2013, Doug Parker, CEO of American Airlines Group, announced that TWA heritage aircraft would be added in the future: "We will continue that tradition at American, including introducing a TWA aircraft in the future and keeping a US Airways livery aircraft. That also means we will keep a heritage American livery in the fleet". On November 16, 2015, American painted a 737-823 in the TWA livery (with American titles, as shown to the right). The last of the TWA MD-83s stayed in service until September 2019. This was the last Trans World Airlines, Inc. aircraft in the American Airlines fleet.

An original lighted TWA sign still exists (as of 2019) on the east side of Saarinen's TWA Flight Center terminal facing JetBlue's Terminal 5. This sign has been incorporated by the TWA Hotel as part of their use of the TWA Flight Center building.

On May 15, 2019, the TWA Hotel opened in the Flight Center's headhouse, after four years of restoration work that began in 2015. In addition to replacing and repairing much of the infrastructure of the building, additional buildings were constructed to house the hotel rooms, with the Flight Center's interior being used for the lobby, restaurants and exhibition facilities. In addition, a vintage Lockheed Constellation L-1649 Starliner was acquired and fully restored for use as the hotel's cocktail bar, being placed on a section of apron in front of the hotel.

== Destinations ==
For commuter destinations, see Trans World Express and Trans World Connection.

TWA had codeshare agreements with the following airlines:

- Air Europa
- Air Malta
- America West Airlines
- American Airlines
- Kuwait Airways
- Royal Air Maroc
- Royal Jordanian

== Fleet ==
=== Final fleet ===
When Trans World Airlines was acquired by American Airlines in 2001, their fleet contained the following aircraft:

Trans World Airlines fleet
Aircraft	In service	Orders	Passengers				Notes
Aircraft	In service	Orders	F	C	Y	Total	Notes
Airbus A318-100	—	50	TBA				Orders were transferred to American Airlines, but were later cancelled.
Airbus A330-300	—	20	TBA				Orders were transferred to American Airlines, but were later cancelled.
Boeing 717-200	29	—	16	–	95	111	All were transferred to American Airlines and later retired in 2003.
Boeing 757-200	27	—	–	22	158	180	All were transferred to American Airlines. Later sold to different airlines due to being powered by different engines from American Airlines Boeing 757 aircraft. Most are still in service with Delta Air Lines.
Boeing 767-300ER	9	—	30	–	178	208	All were transferred to American Airlines. Later sold to different airlines due to being powered by different engines from American Airlines Boeing 757 aircraft. Most are still in service with Delta Air Lines.
McDonnell Douglas MD-82	39	—	–	12	132	144	All were transferred to American Airlines and later retired in 2019.
McDonnell Douglas MD-83	64	—	–	12	130	142	All were transferred to American Airlines and later retired in 2019.
Total	168	70					

=== Retired fleet ===
Trans World Airlines had previously operated the following aircraft:

Trans World Airlines retired fleet
Aircraft	Total	Introduced	Retired	Notes
Boeing 307 Stratoliner	5	1940	1951	
Boeing 707-120B	59	1960	1983	
Boeing 707-320B	67	1960	1983	One destroyed by a bomb as TWA Flight 841.
Boeing 720B	4	1961	1962	Leased from Boeing.
Boeing 727-100	35	1964	1993	
Boeing 727-200	61	1968	2000	
Boeing 747-100	25	1970	2000	One crashed as TWA Flight 800.
Boeing 747-200B	7	1984	1998	
Boeing 747SP	3	1979	1986	
Boeing 767-200	12	1982	2001	
Consolidated Fleetster	1	Unknown	Unknown	
Convair 880	28	1960	1974-1991	A former TWA Convair 880, registered as N807AJ, made the type's last known flight in 1991, ferrying from Mojave Air and Space Port to Atlantic City. While the aircraft's official FAA registration was not canceled until 1998, it never flew again after its 1991 arrival in New Jersey. Instead, it was handed over to the Federal Aviation Administration (FAA) for use as a ground-based fire trainer and for non-destructive fire testing. The airframe remained at the FAA Technical Center until it was finally dismantled in late 2007. One aircraft, N815AJ (formerly N828TW), a complete airframe, is in storage at Scroggins aviation. It is the only complete surviving Convair 880 used by TWA.
Curtiss Kingbird	1	1933	Unknown	
Curtiss C-46 Commando	1	1942	1942	Leased from United States Army Air Force.
Curtiss T-32 Condor II	3	1929	1931	
Douglas DC-1	1	1933	1936	Only DC-1 ever built.
Douglas DC-2	31	1934	1942	
Douglas DC-3	104	1937	1957	
Douglas C-47 Skytrain	104	1937	1957	
Douglas C-54 Skymaster	14	1946	1961	
Fairchild C-82 Packet	1	Unknown	Unknown	The aircraft, N9701F, which was a Steward-Davis Jet-Packet 3400, is now on display at the Hagerstown Aviation Museum, where it keeps the registration.
Fokker Universal	1	1930	1930	
Fokker F-10	8	1931	Unknown	One crashed in 1931 Transcontinental & Western Air Fokker F-10 crash
Fokker F-14	2	1931	Unknown	
Fokker F-32	2	1931	Unknown	
Ford 5-AT-DS Trimotor	22	Unknown	1936	
Lockheed L-12 Electra Junior	1	1940	1945	
Lockheed L-049 Constellation	40	1945	1962	One written off as TWA Flight 6963.
Lockheed L-649 Constellation	1	1947	Unknown	
Lockheed L-749 Constellation	12	1948	1968	
Lockheed L-749A Constellation	28	1950	1968	
Lockheed L-1049 Super Constellation	10	1952	1964	
Lockheed L-1049G Super Constellation	28	1955	1967	
Lockheed L-1049H Super Constellation	9	1957	1961	
Lockheed L-1649A Starliner	30	1957	1967	
Lockheed L-1011 Tristar	41	1972	1997	One written off as TWA Flight 843.
Lockheed L-1329 JetStar	3	Unknown	Unknown	Business jet
Lockheed Orion	4	1931	Unknown	
Lockheed Vega	4	Unknown	Unknown	
Martin 2-0-2A	12	1950	1959	
Martin 4-0-4	40	1950	1961	One written off as TWA Flight 400.
McDonnell Douglas DC-9-14	6	1966	1979	
McDonnell Douglas DC-9-15	14	1966	1980	
McDonnell Douglas DC-9-15	7	1986	1999	Former Ozark Air Lines fleet.
McDonnell Douglas DC-9-31	18	1986	2001	Former Ozark Air Lines fleet.
McDonnell Douglas DC-9-32	16	1986	2001	
McDonnell Douglas DC-9-34	3	1986	1999	Former Ozark Air Lines fleet.
McDonnell Douglas DC-9-41	3	1986	1999	Former Ozark Air Lines fleet.
McDonnell Douglas DC-9-51	12	1993	1999	Former Eastern Air Lines fleet.
Northrop Alpha	14	1931	1935	
Sikorsky S-61L	1	Unknown	Unknown	Helicopter
Stearman C3B	1	Unknown	Unknown	

TWA, at one time, also held orders for both the BAC-Aérospatiale Concorde and Boeing 2707 supersonic transports (SST) as well as the Sud Aviation Caravelle and the Airbus A330-300. The remaining A330 orders were eventually converted to A318 orders. TWA, along with Alaska Airlines, Braniff International, Southwest Airlines and USAir, are the only major U.S.-based airlines to never have operated the McDonnell Douglas DC-10 as TWA chose the Lockheed L-1011 instead.

=== Fleet in 1970 ===
Trans World Airlines fleet in 1970
Aircraft	Total	Orders	Notes
Aérospatiale/BAC Concorde	—	—	6 on option
Boeing 2707	—	—	12 on option
Boeing 707-120	58	—	
Boeing 707-320	49	—	
Boeing 707-320C	14	—	
Boeing 727-100	27	—	
Boeing 727-100QC	8	—	
Boeing 727-200	32	—	
Boeing 747-100	3	12	
Convair 880	25	—	
Douglas DC-9-15	19	—	
Lockheed L-1011 TriStar	—	22	
Total	225	34	

== Accidents and incidents ==
Since 1942, TWA was involved in 84 incidents.

One of the first to gain wide press coverage was the crash of NC1946 (a DC-3), operating as Flight 3, which killed Hollywood film star Carole Lombard, her mother, and 20 others.

On July 11, 1946, a TWA Lockheed Constellation, NC86513, operating as TWA Flight 513, a training flight, crashed in Reading, Pennsylvania. Of six crew members, only one survived. The crash was caused by a fire in the cargo hold and grounded all Constellations from July 12 until August 23, 1946.

Another disaster that gained widespread coverage was the collision of a TWA Lockheed L-1049 Super Constellation with a United Airlines' Douglas DC-7 over the Grand Canyon in 1956, which killed all 128 people on board both airliners. This accident led to groundbreaking changes in the regulation of flight operations in the United States.

A similar event occurred in 1960, this time in New York City, when another TWA L-1049 collided with a United Douglas DC-8. The disaster killed 134 people: 84 on board the UAL DC-8, 44 on board the TWA L-1049, and six people on the ground. No one survived from either airliner.

On June 26, 1959, a TWA Lockheed L-1649 Starliner, N7313C, operating as TWA Flight 891, crashed in a violent thunderstorm after it departed from Malpensa Airport, some 25 miles northwest of Milan, at 16.20. The aircraft was struck by lightning while flying at 11,000 feet above the ground, disintegrated with a tremendous explosion, burst into flames and crashed in several charred parts scattered over an area of five miles

=== Terrorist target ===
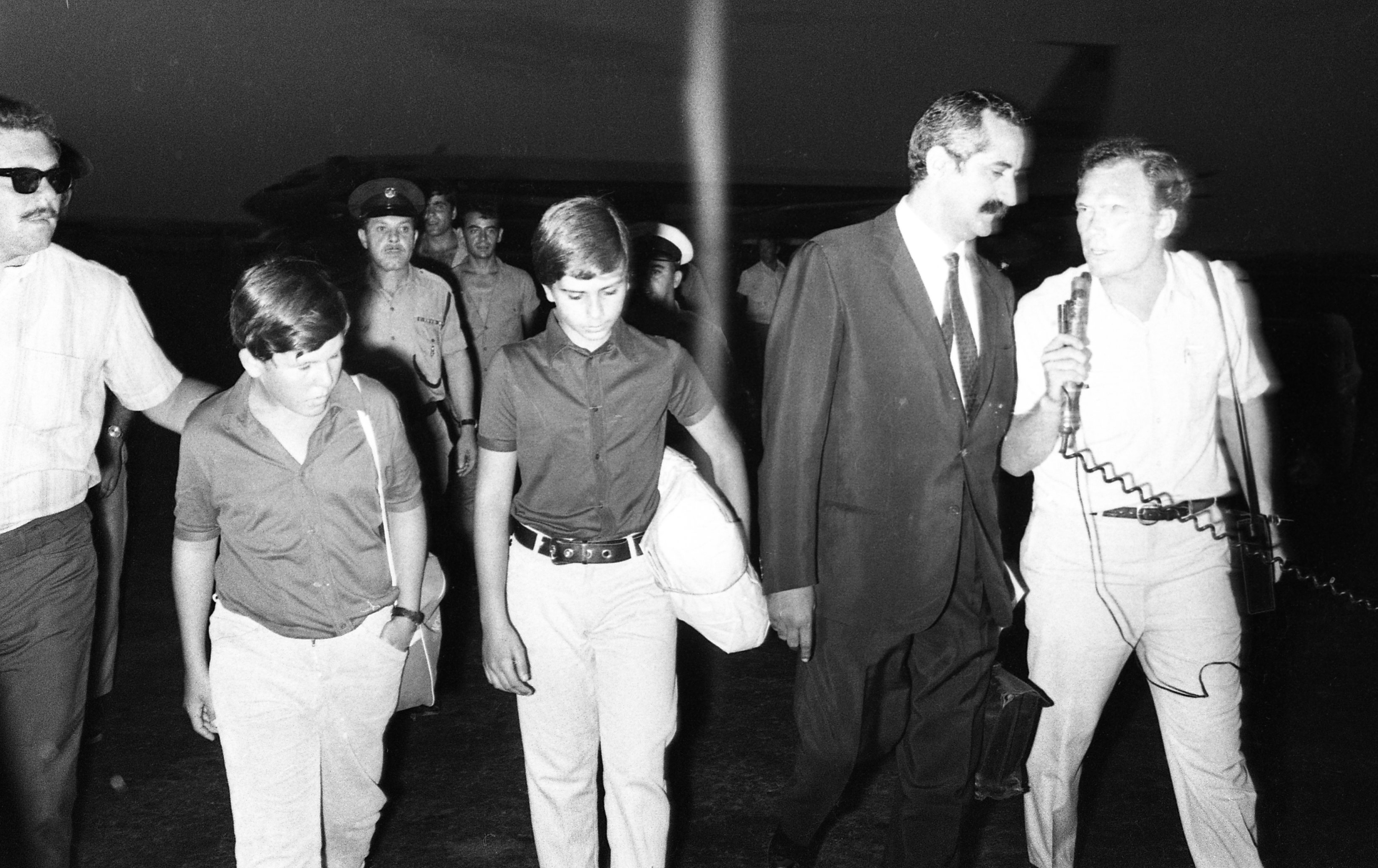
Passengers from the hijacked TWA plane arrive at Lod, 1969.

From 1969 to 1986, six TWA airliners were terrorist targets for Palestinian fedayeen, four of which were hijackings and two were bombings, mainly because the airline had a strong European presence, was a flag carrier for the United States, and flew to Israel.

- In 1969, TWA Flight 840 from Rome to Athens was hijacked and forcibly diverted to Damascus. Nobody was injured, but the aircraft's nose was blown up (although replaced and the plane returned to service).
- In 1970, TWA Flight 741 was hijacked after taking off from Frankfurt am Main en route to New York City. It was taken to Dawson's Field in Jordan, along with two other hijacked aircraft. All three aircraft were empty of passengers and crew when they were destroyed. A fourth aircraft landed in Cairo and had a similar fate.
- In 1971, three members of the group "Republic of New Afrika" who had murdered a New Mexico State Police officer on November 8 hijacked TWA Flight 106, a Boeing 727, from Albuquerque to Havana. Passengers were released in Tampa, Florida.
- In 1974, TWA Flight 841 from Tel Aviv to New York City crashed into the Ionian Sea shortly after takeoff from Athens en route to Rome after a bomb believed to have been in the cargo hold exploded, killing all 88 on board.
- In 1976, TWA Flight 355 was hijacked by five Croatian separatists as it flew from New York–LaGuardia to O'Hare International. They ordered the pilot to fly to Montreal, where the plane was refueled, and then made additional refueling stops in Gander and Keflavik; at some of these stops, the hijackers unloaded propaganda pamphlets that they demanded to be dropped over Montreal, Chicago, New York, London, and Paris. At the plane's final stop, Paris–Charles de Gaulle, the hijackers surrendered after direct talks with U.S. Ambassador Kenneth Rush, and their explosives were revealed to be fakes.
- In 1985, TWA Flight 847 from Athens to Rome was hijacked first to Beirut, then to Algiers, back to Beirut, back to Algiers, and finally back to Beirut—with some of its fuel being paid for by the Shell credit card of flight attendant Uli Derickson. United States Navy Petty Officer 2nd Class Robert Stethem was singled out by Hezbollah as a member of the American military. The hijackers beat and tortured Stethem; Mohammed Ali Hammadi murdered the dying sailor and dumped his body on the tarmac. Robert Stethem was awarded the Purple Heart and Bronze Star with burial in Arlington National Cemetery. The memory of Robert Dean Stethem is honored by his nation with a namesake U.S. Navy destroyer, the USS Stethem (DDG-63).
- In 1986, TWA Flight 840, on approach to Athens, Greece, was attacked with an on-board bomb, causing four Americans (including a nine-month-old infant) to be ejected from the aircraft to their deaths. Five others on the aircraft were injured as the cabin experienced a rapid decompression. The remaining 110 passengers survived the incident, and pilot Richard "Pete" Petersen made an emergency landing in Athens.

=== TWA Flight 800 ===
TWA's worst accident occurred on July 17, 1996, when Flight 800, a Boeing 747 en route to Paris, exploded over the Atlantic Ocean near Long Island, killing all 230 people on board. The National Transportation Safety Board concluded that the most likely cause of the disaster was a center-fuel-tank explosion sparked by exposed wiring. In their subsequent coverage, the media focused heavily on the fact that TWA's airline fleet was among the oldest in service (the 747 used for Flight 800 was manufactured in 1971, making it 25 years old at the time of the incident). The flight was under the command of Captain Steven Snyder, a veteran TWA pilot.

== Crew bases ==
TWA had crew bases in Boston, New York, Washington, D.C., St. Louis, Kansas City, Chicago, San Francisco, Los Angeles, and Frankfurt. International flight attendants' crew bases were located in Paris, Rome, Hong Kong, and, at one time, Cairo. Starting in 1996, TWA had a "West Coast Regional Domicile", in which pilots and flight attendants covered originating flights out of major West Coast U.S. airports from San Diego, California, north to San Francisco.

== Ambassadors Club ==
TWA operated Ambassadors Club locations in various airports. American Airlines acquired some clubs, and other clubs closed on December 2, 2001. Before the closure of the clubs, TWA maintained clubs at:

=== Clubs in North America open on December 1, 2001 ===
- United States
  - California
    - Los Angeles (Los Angeles International Airport) (Converted into Alaska Airlines Board Room)
    - San Francisco (San Francisco International Airport) (Converted into Alaska Airlines Board Room)
  - Massachusetts
    - Boston (Logan International Airport)
  - Missouri
    - Kansas City (Kansas City International Airport) (Converted into Admirals Club)
    - St. Louis (Lambert-St. Louis International Airport) (Converted into Admirals Club)
  - New York
    - New York City (LaGuardia Airport)
  - Virginia
    - Washington, D.C., area (Washington Dulles International Airport)

=== Clubs in North America and the Caribbean closed prior to dissolution ===
- United States
  - Arizona
    - Phoenix (Sky Harbor International Airport)
  - California
    - (San Diego International Airport)
  - New Mexico
    - Albuquerque (Albuquerque International Sunport)
  - New Jersey
    - Newark (Newark Liberty International Airport)
  - New York
    - New York City (John F. Kennedy International Airport)
  - Ohio
    - Columbus (Port Columbus International Airport)
    - Dayton (Dayton International Airport)
  - Texas
    - Dallas/Fort Worth (Dallas/Fort Worth International Airport)
    - Houston (George Bush Intercontinental Airport)
  - Virginia
    - Washington, D.C., area (Washington Reagan National Airport)
  - Washington
    - (Seattle-Tacoma International Airport)
- Puerto Rico
  - San Juan (Luis Muñoz Marín International Airport)

=== Clubs in Europe closed prior to dissolution ===
- United Kingdom
  - London (London Gatwick Airport)
- France
  - Paris (Charles de Gaulle Airport)
- Italy
  - Milan (Malpensa Airport)
  - Rome (Leonardo Da Vinci Airport)
- Germany
  - Frankfurt (Frankfurt Airport) (became an American Airlines Admirals Club in 1997)

== Leadership ==
Presidents and chairman of TWA were:

=== President ===
1. Harris Mathewson Hanshue, 1930–1931
2. Richard W. Robbins, 1931–1934
3. William John Frye, December 27, 1934 – February 21, 1947
4. LaMotte Turck Cohu, April 24, 1947 – June 1, 1948
5. Ralph Shepard Damon, January 25, 1949 – January 4, 1956 †
6. Carter Lane Burgess, February 4, 1957 – January 1, 1958
7. Warren Lee Pierson (acting), January 9, 1958 – July 2, 1958
8. Charles Sparks Thomas, July 2, 1958 – July 28, 1960
9. Charles Carpenter Tillinghast Jr., April 17, 1961 – April 24, 1969
10. Forwood Cloud Wiser Jr., April 24, 1969 – June 18, 1975
11. Charles Carpenter Tillinghast Jr. (acting), June 18, 1975 – January 6, 1976
12. Carl Edwin Meyer Jr., January 6, 1976 – September 23, 1985
13. Richard Dwayne Pearson, September 23, 1985 – June 11, 1986
14. D. Joseph Corr, January 15, 1987 – October 31, 1988
15. Jeffrey Hartford Erickson, April 1994 – January 1997
16. William F. Compton, December 3, 1997 – October 1, 2001

=== Chairman of the Board ===
1. Henry Belin du Pont III, October 13, 1934 – February 7, 1936
2. Thomas Bayne Wilson, November 29, 1938 – February 15, 1947
3. Warren Lee Pierson, April 24, 1947 – April 27, 1961
4. Ernest Robert Breech, April 27, 1961 – April 24, 1969
5. Charles Carpenter Tillinghast Jr., April 24, 1969 – December 31, 1977
6. Louis Edwin Smart Jr., January 1, 1977 – January 1, 1979
  Subsidiary of Transworld Corporation, January 1, 1979 – February 1984
7. Carl Celian Icahn, January 1986 – ?
8. William Reed Howard, July 13, 1993 – January 4, 1994
9. Donald Forsyth Craib Jr., January 4, 1994 – February 28, 1995
10. John Conway Cahill, February 28, 1995 – November 4, 1995 †
11. Thomas Francis Meagher, November 14, 1995 – February 12, 1997
12. Gerald Leslie Gitner, February 12, 1997 – 1999

† = died in office

== Bibliography ==
- Wigton, D.C. (1963). From Jernny to jet. Los Angeles (CA.): Floyd Clymer Publications.
- Serling, R.J. (1983). Howard Hughes'airline-An informal history of TWA. New York: St. Martin's Press/Marek.
- Davies, R.E.G. (1987). Rebels and reformers of the airways. Airlife Publishing Ltd. & Smithsonian Institution Press.
- Cearley, G.W. (1988). TWA. Dallas (TX): Airline Publications and Sales.
- Davies, R.E.G. (2000). TWA-An airline and its aircraft. Airlife Publishing.
- Szurovy, G. (2000). Classic American airlines. St. Paul (MN): Motorbooks International/MBI Publishing Co.

== See also ==
- Ransome Airlines – American regional airline
- List of defunct airlines of the United States
