= Transpacific Route Case =

The Transpacific Route Case was a major administrative law case argued before the Civil Aeronautics Board for much of the 1960s. Before the case, the only U.S. airlines permitted to fly transpacific routes were Pan Am and Northwest Orient. Continental Airlines also flew transpacific routes on military contract, but was not allowed to carry civilians.

President Dwight Eisenhower opened the case in 1959 in order to investigate opening the market up to further competition, but he closed the case shortly before leaving office. John F. Kennedy reopened the case in 1961.

The CAB concluded the case in 1969, retaining Northwest and Pan Am's routes to Asia and making the following additional route awards:

- American Airlines - Australia, Fiji, Hawaii, New Zealand, Samoa
- Continental Airlines - Guam, Hawaii, Saipan
- Northwest Airlines - Hawaii to Asia flights
- Trans World Airlines - Hawaii, Japan, Taiwan
- Western Airlines - Hawaii

The award was a great victory for TWA, which had already established service from the U.S. to Europe, connecting onward as far east as Hong Kong. The case gave TWA a "round the world route" and allowed it to serve South and Southeast Asia in both westbound and eastbound directions. Initially, Continental Airlines was awarded routes to Australia and New Zealand with stops. However, President Nixon, upon taking office set aside the international route awards. The rights previously given to Continental Airlines were later given to American Airlines.

One loser in the case was American, which had petitioned long and hard for rights to serve Japan: it did not want the South Pacific routes, and it ended up trading those routes to Pan Am. United Airlines was the biggest loser of all: it received no transpacific routes, besides some Hawaiian routes that were added in the early 1960s.
