= Charles C. Tillinghast Jr. =

American business executive (1911–1998)

Charles Carpenter Tillinghast Jr.

15th Chancellor of Brown University
- In office 1968–1979
- Preceded by: H. Stanford McLeod
- Succeeded by: Richard Salomon

Personal details
- Born: January 30, 1911 Saxtons River, Vermont
- Died: July 25, 1998 (aged 87) Little Compton, Rhode Island
- Education: Brown University

Charles Carpenter Tillinghast Jr. (January 30, 1911 – July 25, 1998) was an American business executive. He was chairman of Trans World Airlines and chancellor of Brown University.

== Biography ==
Tillinghast was born on January 30, 1911, in Saxtons River, Vermont. He was the son of Charles Carpenter Tillinghast Sr. (1884–1961). He attended Horace Mann School and Brown University, where he played football, graduating in 1932.

He graduated from Columbia Law School in 1935 and became a lawyer in Manhattan. He was on the staff of district attorney Thomas E. Dewey in New York City and a partner with the law firm Hughes, Schurman and Dwight.

In 1957, he joined Bendix Corporation, becoming director of its foreign operations. He was a vice president at Bendix in 1961 when he was hired as president and CEO of TWA in a deal sponsored by creditors seeking to oust Howard Hughes from control of the airline. Because control of the airline was in litigation, Tillinghast received an employment contract, dubbed a "golden parachute", the first known use of that term. He served as chairman until 1976.

Tillinghast oversaw a golden era for TWA as it moved to a hub system and achieved dominance in the trans-Atlantic market, and expanded TWA's reach into the hospitality industry by way of its purchase of the Hilton Hotels chain through a newly created division called the Trans World Corporation. He was criticized for ignoring the Pacific and domestic U.S. routes. During his tenure the airline industry went through major changes, including spikes in fuel prices and the advent of terrorism.

Tillinghast was chancellor of Brown from 1967 to 1978. In 1998, the university established the Tillinghast Professorship in International Studies in his honor.

Tillinghast died July 25, 1998, in Little Compton, Rhode Island.
