= Bainbridge =

Bainbridge may refer to:

== People ==
- Bainbridge (name)

== Places ==
=== United States ===
- Bainbridge Township (disambiguation)
- Bainbridge Island, Alaska
- Bainbridge, Georgia
- Bainbridge, Indiana
- Bainbridge (town), New York
  - Bainbridge (village), New York
- Bainbridge, Geauga County, Ohio
- Bainbridge, Ross County, Ohio
- Bainbridge, Pennsylvania
- Bainbridge Island, Washington
- United States Naval Training Center Bainbridge, Maryland

=== Other countries ===
- Bainbridge, British Columbia, Canada
- Bainbridge, North Yorkshire, England

== Other ==
- Bainbridge College, a community college in Bainbridge, Georgia, US
- Bainbridge Cup, a trophy in the game of pickleball
- Bainbridge reflex, in Physiology, also called the atrial reflex
- 5 ships named USS Bainbridge
- Bainbridge, the former name of the John Lewis Newcastle department store in Newcastle upon Tyne, England
