= Bainbridge (name) =

Bainbridge is both a surname and a given name. Notable people with the name include:

== Surname ==
- Beryl Bainbridge (1932–2010), English novelist
- Beverley Bainbridge (1940–2016), Australian Olympic swimmer
- Bill Bainbridge (1922–1966), English footballer
- Bob Bainbridge (1897–1967), English footballer
- Christopher Bainbridge (1464?–1514), Archbishop of York and Cardinal
- Dave Bainbridge (born 1959), English progressive guitarist and keyboardist
- David Bainbridge (artist), English writer
- David Bainbridge (scientist) (born 1968), English scientist
- Dionne Bainbridge (born 1978), New Zealand Olympic swimmer
- Emerson Bainbridge (1845–1911), British mining engineer and MP
- Gilbert Ronald Bainbridge (1925–2003), British nuclear physicist and engineer
- Joe Bainbridge (1888–1954), English footballer
- John Bainbridge (footballer) (1880–1960), English footballer
- John Bainbridge (astronomer) (1582–1643), English astronomer
- John Bainbridge (author) (born 1953), British author and countryside campaigner
- John Bainbridge (Royal Navy officer) (1845–1901), Irish cricketer and Royal Navy officer
- Kenneth Bainbridge (1904–1996), American physicist, director of the Trinity test during the Manhattan Project
- Lisanne Bainbridge, cognitive psychologist
- Merril Bainbridge (born 1968), Australian musician
- Robert S. Bainbridge (1913–1959), New York state senator
- Simon Bainbridge (1952–2021), English composer
- Simpson Bainbridge (1895–1988), English footballer
- Stephen Bainbridge (born 1958), American corporate law professor at UCLA and blogger
- William Bainbridge (disambiguation), several people

- William Bainbridge (1774–1833), commodore in the U.S. Navy.
- William G. Bainbridge (1925–2008), U.S. Army Sergeant Major of the Army
- William Sims Bainbridge (born 1940), American sociologist
- William Seaman Bainbridge (1870–1947), American surgeon and gynecologist
- William Bainbridge (lawyer) (1811–1869) British lawyer and writer associated with Newcastle upon Tyne
- William Bainbridge (MP) (died 1583), MP for Derby

== Given name ==
- Bainbridge Colby (1869–1950), US Secretary of State
- Bainbridge Wadleigh (1831–1891), United States senator from New Hampshire
