= Benbridge =

Benbridge is a surname. Notable people with the surname include:

- Helen Benbridge (1876–1964), American suffragist
- Henry Benbridge (1743–1812), American painter
- Hetty Benbridge (died 1776), American painter, wife of Henry

== See also ==
- Bainbridge (name)
