= 1945–46 Manchester United F.C. season =

English football club season

Manchester United
1945–46 season
- Chairman: James W. Gibson
- Manager: Matt Busby (unofficial until 1 October 1945, and officially since)
- Stadium: Maine Road
- War League North Regional League: 4th
- FA Cup: Fourth Round
- Top goalscorer: League: n/a All: Jimmy Hanlon (2); Jack Rowley (2); Billy Wrigglesworth (2)
- Highest home attendance: 36,237 vs Preston North End (26 January 1946)
- Lowest home attendance: 15,339 vs Accrington Stanley (9 January 1946)
- Average home league attendance: 25,788
Home colours	Away colours

The 1945–46 season was Manchester United's seventh and last season in the non-competitive War League during the Second World War. With the ending of the war, the FA Cup returned in January 1946, with Manchester United losing 3–2 on aggregate to Preston North End in the Fourth Round.

Matt Busby had been appointed as the successor to Walter Crickmer as manager in February 1945, and officially took over the position on 1 October, following his demobilisation from the British Army. He was joined by head coach Jimmy Murphy in early 1946.

== War League North Regional League ==
Date	Opponents	H / A	Result F–A	Scorers	Attendance
25 August 1945	Huddersfield Town	A	2–3	Smith (2)	
1 September 1945	Huddersfield Town	H	2–3	Koffman, Rowley	
8 September 1945	Chesterfield	H	0–2		
12 September 1945	Middlesbrough	A	1–2	Davie	
15 September 1945	Chesterfield	A	1–1	Bryant	
20 September 1945	Stoke City	A	2–1	Hullett, Reid	
22 September 1945	Barnsley	A	2–2	Cockburn, Hullett	
29 September 1945	Barnsley	H	1–1	Smith	
6 October 1945	Everton	H	0–0		
13 October 1945	Everton	A	0–3		
20 October 1945	Bolton Wanderers	A	1–1	Wrigglesworth	
27 October 1945	Bolton Wanderers	H	2–1	Carey, Worrall	
3 November 1945	Preston North End	H	6–1	Rowley (2), Smith, Warner, Worrall	
10 November 1945	Preston North End	A	2–2	Bainbridge, Smith	
17 November 1945	Leeds United	A	3–3	Hanlon (2), Buckle	
24 November 1945	Leeds United	H	6–1	Buckle (2), Wrigglesworth (2), Hanlon, Rowley	
1 December 1945	Burnley	H	3–3	Hullett (3)	
8 December 1945	Burnley	A	2–2	Hanlon, Smith	
15 December 1945	Sunderland	H	2–1	Smith (2)	
22 December 1945	Sunderland	A	2–4	Smith, Wrigglesworth	
25 December 1945	Sheffield United	A	0–1		
26 December 1945	Sheffield United	H	2–3	Carey, Hullett	
29 December 1945	Middlesbrough	H	4–1	Rowley (2), Smith (2)	
12 January 1946	Grimsby Town	H	5–0	Rowley (3), Bainbridge, Smith	
19 January 1946	Grimsby Town	A	0–1		
2 February 1946	Blackpool	H	4–2	Rowley (2), Bainbridge, Wrigglesworth	
9 February 1946	Liverpool	H	2–1	Smith (2)	
16 February 1946	Liverpool	A	5–0	Hanlon (2), Rowley (2), Wrigglesworth	
23 February 1946	Bury	A	1–1	Hanlon	
2 March 1946	Bury	H	1–1	Hanlon	
9 March 1946	Blackburn Rovers	H	6–2	Rowley (3), Hanlon (2), Delaney	
16 March 1946	Blackburn Rovers	A	3–1	Smith (2), Pearson	
23 March 1946	Bradford	A	1–2	Carey	
27 March 1946	Blackpool	A	5–1	Pearson (3), Carey, Wrigglesworth	
30 March 1946	Bradford	H	4–0	Aston, Delaney, Rowley, Wrigglesworth	
6 April 1946	Manchester City	H	1–4	Aston	
13 April 1946	Manchester City	A	3–1	Hanlon, Pearson, Rowley	
19 April 1946	Newcastle United	A	1–0	Pearson	
20 April 1946	Sheffield Wednesday	H	4–0	Pearson (2), Delaney, Rowley	
22 April 1946	Newcastle United	H	4–1	Delaney, Mitten, Rowley, Wrigglesworth	
27 April 1946	Sheffield Wednesday	A	0–1		
4 May 1946	Stoke City	H	2–1	Buckle, Pearson	

Pos	Team	Pld	W	D	L	GF	GA	GR	Pts
2	Everton	42	23	9	10	88	54	1.630	55
3	Bolton Wanderers	42	20	11	11	67	45	1.489	51
4	Manchester United	42	19	11	12	98	62	1.581	49
5	Sheffield Wednesday	42	20	8	14	67	60	1.117	48
6	Newcastle United	42	21	5	16	106	70	1.514	47

Source: rsssf.com

== FA Cup ==
All games in the first to sixth rounds were two-legged, due to the absence of League football.

Date	Round	Opponents	H / A	Result F–A	Scorers	Attendance
5 January 1946	Third round First leg	Accrington Stanley	A	2–2	Smith, Wrigglesworth	9,968
9 January 1946	Third round Second leg	Accrington Stanley	H	5–1	Rowley (2), Bainbridge, Wrigglesworth, own goal	15,339
26 January 1946	Fourth round First leg	Preston North End	H	1–0	Hanlon	36,237
30 January 1946	Fourth round Second leg	Preston North End	A	1–3	Hanlon	21,000

== Squad statistics ==
Pos.	Name	FA Cup	
Pos.	Name	Apps	Goals
GK	(England) Jack Crompton	4	0
FB	(Republic of Ireland) Johnny Carey	4	0
FB	(Republic of Ireland) John Roach	2	0
FB	(England) Joe Walton	2	0
HB	(England) Allenby Chilton	3	0
HB	(England) Henry Cockburn	4	0
HB	(Wales) Jack Warner	4	0
HB	(England) Bert Whalley	4	0
FW	(England) Bill Bainbridge	1	1
FW	(England) Jimmy Hanlon	4	2
FW	(England) Jack Rowley	4	2
FW	(England) Jack Smith	4	1
FW	(England) Billy Wrigglesworth	4	2
–	Own goals	–	1
