= William Bainbridge (disambiguation) =

William Bainbridge (1774–1833) was a commodore in the U.S. Navy.

William Bainbridge may also refer to:

- Bill Bainbridge (1922–1966), English footballer
- William G. Bainbridge (1925–2008), U.S. Army Sergeant Major of the Army
- William Sims Bainbridge (born 1940), American sociologist
- William Seaman Bainbridge (1870–1947), American surgeon and gynecologist
- William Bainbridge (lawyer) (1811–1869) British lawyer and writer associated with Newcastle upon Tyne
- William Bainbridge (MP) (died 1583), MP for Derby

== See also ==
- William Bainbridge Castle (1814–1872), American politician, mayor of Cleveland, Ohio
- William Bambridge (1820–1879), missionary in Waimate, New Zealand and photographer to Queen Victoria
- USS Bainbridge, several ships named after the US commodore
