= John Bainbridge =

John Bainbridge may refer to:

- John Bainbridge (footballer) (1880–1960), English footballer
- John Bainbridge (astronomer) (1582–1643), English astronomer
- John Bainbridge (author) (born 1953), British author and countryside campaigner
- John Bainbridge (Royal Navy officer) (1845–1901), Irish cricketer and Royal Navy officer
