= David Bainbridge =

David Bainbridge may refer to:

- David Bainbridge (artist) (1941–2013), English artist and member of Art & Language
- David Bainbridge (scientist) (born 1968), English writer, biologist and veterinary anatomist
