= Captain John Purves and His Wife =

Painting by Henry Benbridge (1775)

Captain John Purves and His Wife, Eliza Anne Pritchard
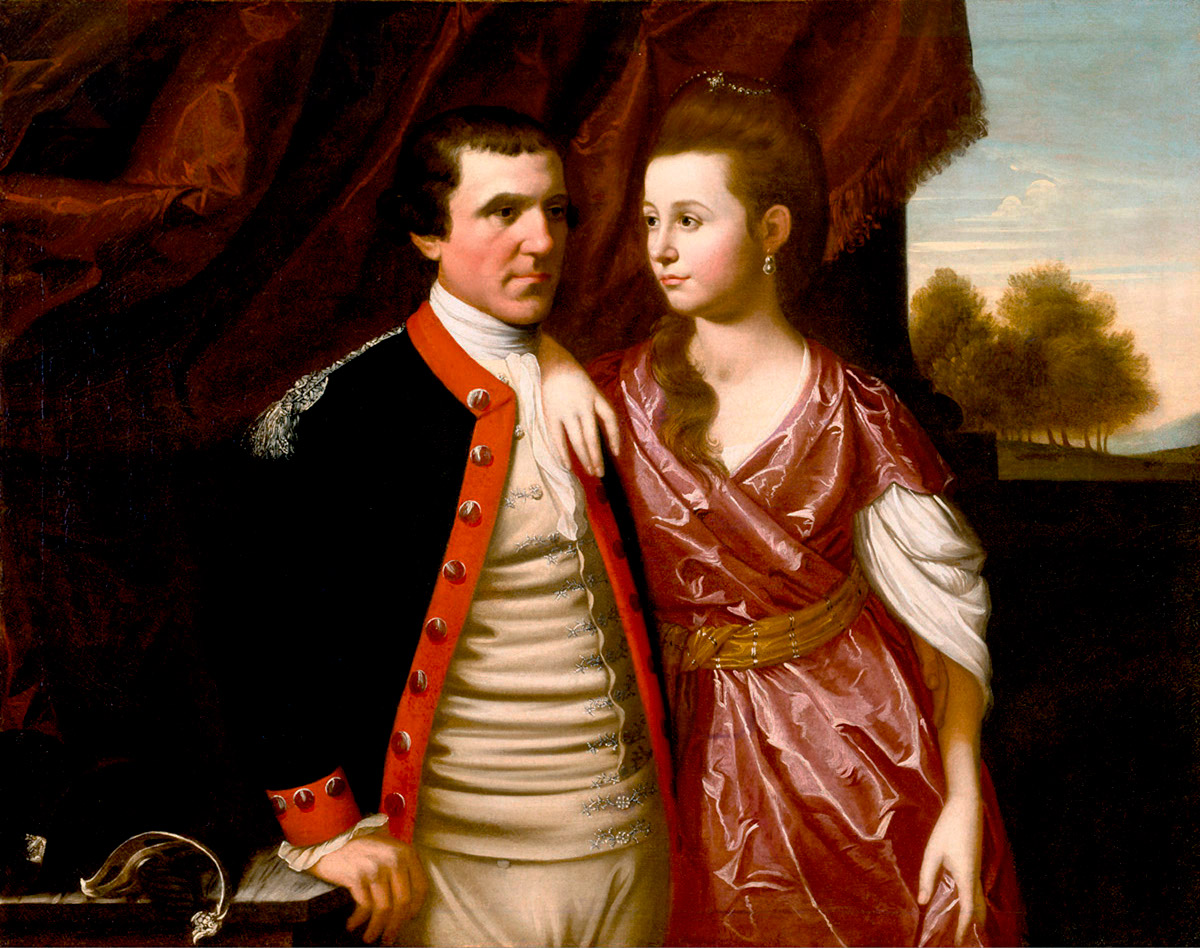
- Artist: Henry Benbridge
- Year: 1775
- Medium: Oil on canvas
- Dimensions: 83 cm × 67.3 cm (33 in × 26.5 in)
- Location: Winterthur Museum, Garden and Library, Winterthur, Delaware,

Captain John Purves and His Wife, Eliza Anne Pritchard, is an oil-on-canvas portrait created by American painter Henry Benbridge (1743–1812). It was painted in Charleston, South Carolina, in 1775 (possibly as late as 1777). A bequest from Henry Francis du Pont, the painting is held in the permanent collection of the Winterthur Museum, Garden and Library.

== Subjects ==
Born in 1746, John Purves was a Scottish immigrant who settled outside Edgefield, South Carolina, in 1770. He became an active figure in the American Revolutionary War, serving in the Province of South Carolina's first congress in January and June 1775. In February he married Eliza Anne Pritchard, daughter of Charleston's sheriff. In June, he was commissioned captain of a ranger company of the 3rd South Carolina Regiment. The couple's portrait was commissioned to mark both occasions. Purves fought at Sullivan's Island and ended the war as lieutenant colonel of the Lower Ninety-Six District Regiment of Militia. After the war, he became a state legislator and owned extensive properties. He died in 1792.

== Depiction ==
Handed down through the Purveses' descendants to Eliza McKellar, this "vigorously painted double portrait" depicts the husband and wife in 1775 on the occasion of their marriage. In the portrait, Purves wears his regimental uniform: a blue coat with red facings, silver buttons, and one silver epaulet. Elegantly dressed, Pritchard leans on her husband's shoulder, "looking rather anxiously at his face." The portrait's style reflects the influence of British-American painter Benjamin West, with whom Benbridge studied in London in 1769. The figures' poses echo those in English portraits, and the woman's fashionable dress is typical among the period's Charleston elite.

== Analysis ==
Double portraits of husband and wife in the same frame, with no children or others present, are "surprisingly rare" in American colonial-era art. Even during the late eighteenth century, "few sitters are portrayed as equally as the Purveses are." The couple is portrayed as "equal partners on a joint enterprise" who are on intimate terms. They occupy comparable amount of spaces and portions of the picture plane, while Eliza touches John and leans into his shoulder. Both are standing and the wife's stature matches her husband's, whereas the era's double portraits had tended to portray women as seated or otherwise below their husbands. According to art historian Margaretta M. Lovell, the figures' comparable representation and intimate attitudes "suggest the popularity of love matches and a new acceptability of visible demonstrations of private affection," documenting the late eighteenth century's turn toward "companionate marriage," wherein spouses formed a more coequal and loving partnership.
