= Robert Bainbridge =

Robert Bainbridge may refer to:

- Bob Bainbridge (1897–1967), English footballer for Lincoln City
- Robert Bainbridge (footballer) (1931–2021), English footballer for York City
- Robert S. Bainbridge (1913–1959), American politician from New York
