= Capture of USS Retaliation =

- Part of the Quasi War
Date	November 20, 1798
Location	Unknown
Result	French victory

Belligerents
United States	(French First Republic) France

Commanders and leaders
William Bainbridge	(French First Republic) Michel-Pierre Barreaut

Strength
1 schooner: USS Retaliation–14 guns, 76 to 87 enlisted and officers	2 frigates: L'insurgente–40 guns, 278+ enlisted and officers Volontaire–40 guns, unknown crew

Casualties and losses
1 warship captured	Unknown

On November 20, 1798, a pair of French Navy frigates, the L'insurgente and Volontaire, with some 80 guns in combined strength, captured an American 14-gun schooner, USS Retaliation. The ship was later recaptured on June 28, 1799, and the L'insurgente was captured the following month as well. The Retaliation was the only American warship captured during the war.
