= USS Bainbridge (1842) =

Brig of the United States Navy

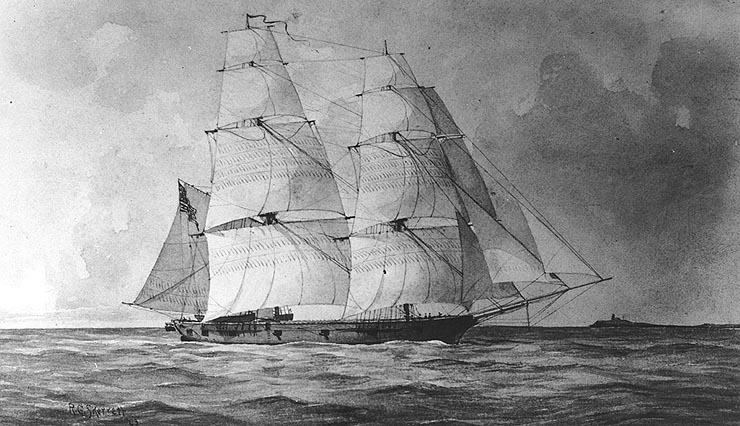
- USS Bainbridge

History

United States
- Name: USS Bainbridge
- Namesake: William Bainbridge
- Operator: United States Navy
- Cost: 40790 dollars
- Launched: April 26, 1842
- Commissioned: December 16, 1842
- Fate: Capsized, August 21, 1863

General characteristics
- Type: Brig
- Displacement: 259 long tons (263 t)
- Length: 100 ft (30 m)
- Beam: 25 ft (7.6 m)
- Draft: 14 ft (4.3 m)
- Propulsion: Sails
- Speed: 11.5 kn (13.2 mph; 21.3 km/h)
- Complement: 100 officers and enlisted
- Armament: 12 × 32 pdr (15 kg) carronades

The first USS Bainbridge was a brig in the United States Navy during the American Civil War. She was named for Commodore William Bainbridge, U.S. Naval Commissioner 1824–1827.

== Service history ==
Bainbridge was launched on April 26, 1842, by Boston Navy Yard and commissioned on December 16, 1842, Commander Z. F. Johnston in command.

Sailing from Boston on January 26, 1843, Bainbridge served with the Home Squadron until returning to New York on May 3, 1844. From June 26, 1844 – October 10, 1847, she served with the Brazil Squadron. She laid up for most of the next year, and from 10 April 1848 – 2 July 1850 was with the Africa Squadron. She departed New York on November 2 and until September 1856 cruised with both the African and Brazil Squadrons. She returned to Norfolk on September 10, 1856.

Laid up at Norfolk Naval Shipyard from September 18, 1856 – April 28, 1858, she departed Hampton Roads, Virginia on May 18, 1858, to join Commodore William B. Shubrick's Paraguay expedition for operations against Paraguay in retaliation for the attack on Water Witch in 1855. Bainbridge arrived at Asunción, Paraguay, in company with the squadron in January 1859 and after the matter had been peacefully settled remained with the Brazil and African Squadrons until departing Rio de Janeiro on September 17, 1860. She arrived at Boston on November 9 and was placed out of commission.

Recommissioned on May 1, 1861, Bainbridge sailed for the Gulf of Mexico on 21 May and cruised there until June 1862. While in the area she captured two schooners and assisted in the capture of one steamer. On August 3, 1862, she sailed from New York to join the East Gulf Blockading Squadron at Key West, Florida.

In September 1862, she was ordered to Aspinwall, Granadine Confederation, where — from November 22–24 — a severe storm forced her to jettison all spars, sails, gun carriages, howitzers, shot, powder, provisions, and water. After extensive repairs she sailed for New York, arriving in May 1863. On August 21, 1863, while proceeding to her station with the South Atlantic Blockading Squadron, she capsized off Cape Hatteras, North Carolina, with the loss of all but one of her crew.
