= USS Bainbridge =

"Ships named after U.S. Navy hero William Bainbridge"

USS Bainbridge may refer to any of five warships named after the early U.S. Navy hero William Bainbridge:

- USS Bainbridge (1842), was a 12-gun brig commissioned in 1842 and lost off Cape Hatteras in 1863
- USS Bainbridge (DD-1), was the first destroyer of the US Navy, in service from 1902 to 1919
- USS Bainbridge (DD-246), was a destroyer, commissioned in 1920 and sold in 1945
- USS Bainbridge (CGN-25), was commissioned as a nuclear-powered frigate and in service from 1962 to 1996. In 1975 during Naval reorganization, she was redesignated as a cruiser
- USS Bainbridge (DDG-96), is an Arleigh Burke-class guided missile destroyer, commissioned on 12 November 2005 and currently in service
