= Hetty Benbridge =

American artist (died 1776)

Hetty Benbridge (died 1776; also known as Esther Benbridge, Hetty Sage, or Letticia Benbridge) was an American painter of miniature portraits.

== Biography ==
Esther "Hetty" Benbridge (née Sage) was from Philadelphia, Pennsylvania. She studied with painter Charles Willson Peale. Peale's influence can be seen in the long oval faces of her portrait subjects.

She married fellow portrait painter Henry Benbridge in early 1772 and they had one son, also named Henry, who was born on December 13, 1772. In April 1773 she moved with her mother and the baby to join her husband in Charleston, South Carolina, where he had established a portrait studio. She was mentioned in the April 5 edition of the South Carolina Gazette as "a very ingenious Miniature Paintress" who had arrived that week from Philadelphia. Hetty Benbridge is thought to have died in 1776.

There are ten extant miniatures attributed to her, although none of the attributed paintings bear her signature. All are painted in watercolor on ivory and set in small gold lockets. Eight of the portraits are of women, including eighteen-year-old Anne Wragg Ferguson, and one depicts a child. The tenth portrait is of a South Carolinian man, John Poage.
