= USS Bainbridge (CGN-25) =

US nuclear-powered guided missile cruiser

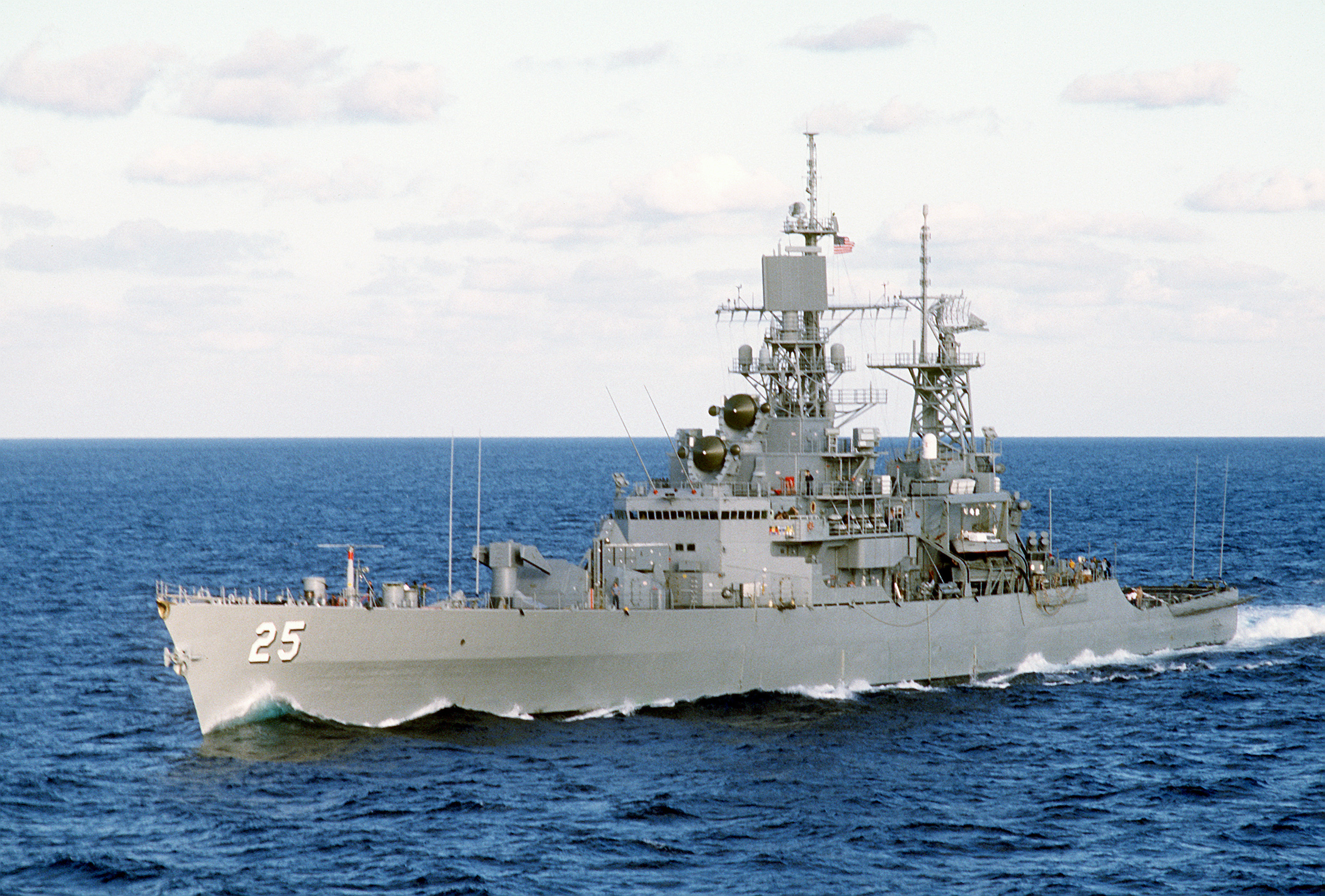
- USS Bainbridge (CGN-25) in November 1986.

History

United States
- Name: Bainbridge
- Namesake: William Bainbridge
- Ordered: 1 September 1958
- Builder: Bethlehem Steel, Quincy, Massachusetts
- Laid down: 5 May 1959
- Launched: 15 April 1961
- Sponsored by: Susan Bainbridge Goodale
- Acquired: 28 September 1962
- Commissioned: 6 October 1962
- Decommissioned: 13 September 1996
- Stricken: 13 September 1996
- Motto: "Mobility Endurance Versatility"
- Fate: Recycled 30 October 1999
- Notes: Originally designated destroyer, re-designated Cruiser
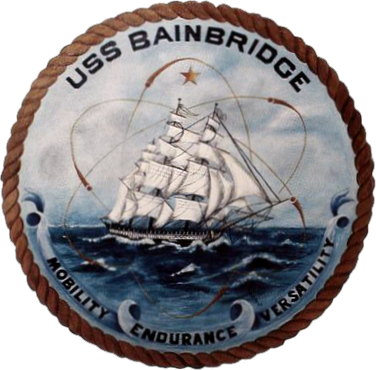
- Badge

General characteristics
- Class & type: Heavily modified nuclear version of the Leahy-class cruiser
- Displacement: 9100 tons
- Length: 565 ft (172 m)
- Beam: 57.75 ft (17.60 m)
- Draft: 29 ft (8.8 m) (maximum)
- Propulsion: 60,000 shp; 2 G.E. Reactors (D2G), Geared Turbines, 2 screws
- Speed: 34 kn (63 km/h; 39 mph)
- Range: Unlimited
- Complement: 556 (43 Officers, 513 enlisted)
- Sensors & processing systems: 1 AN/SPS-10 surface search RADAR; AN/SPS-37 search RADAR; AN/SPS-52 3D air search RADAR; 4 AN/SPG-55 Terrier fire control RADAR; AN/SQS-26 SONAR
- Armament: 2 RIM-2 Terrier Mk-10 twin armed launchers (80 missiles); -Later upgraded to carry SM-2 Standard, 2 × 3-inch/50 (later removed for Harpoon installation); MK 112 ASROC Launcher (8 missiles), 6 × 12.75 in (324 mm) torpedo tubes, 8 Harpoon SSM, -Later added 2 × Phalanx CIWS

USS Bainbridge (DLGN-25/CGN-25) was a nuclear-powered guided missile cruiser in the United States Navy, the only ship of her class. Named in honor of Commodore William Bainbridge, she was the fourth US Navy ship to bear the name. With her original hull classification symbol of DLGN (nuclear-powered guided missile destroyer leader, called a "frigate" at the time), she was the first nuclear-powered destroyer-type ship in the US Navy, and shared her name with the lead ship of the first US Navy destroyer class, the Bainbridge-class destroyers.

Bainbridge was re-designated as a guided missile cruiser in 1975. She was commissioned in 1962, and served for over 30 years in the Atlantic, Pacific, Mediterranean, and Middle East before being decommissioned in 1996.

== Construction ==
Bainbridge was designed and built by Bethlehem Shipbuilding Corporation at Fore River Shipyard at Quincy, Massachusetts. Commissioned in October 1962, she shook down off the East Coast and in the Caribbean area until February 1963, when she began her first Mediterranean deployment. This included demonstrations of her long-range high-speed dash capabilities and operations with the nuclear-powered aircraft carrier Enterprise. Bainbridge returned to the Mediterranean Sea in May 1964, this time joining Enterprise and the guided missile cruiser Long Beach to form the all-nuclear-powered Task Force 1. At the end of July, the three nuclear powered ships began Operation "Sea Orbit", a 30,565 mile, 65 day unrefueled cruise around the world.

== History ==
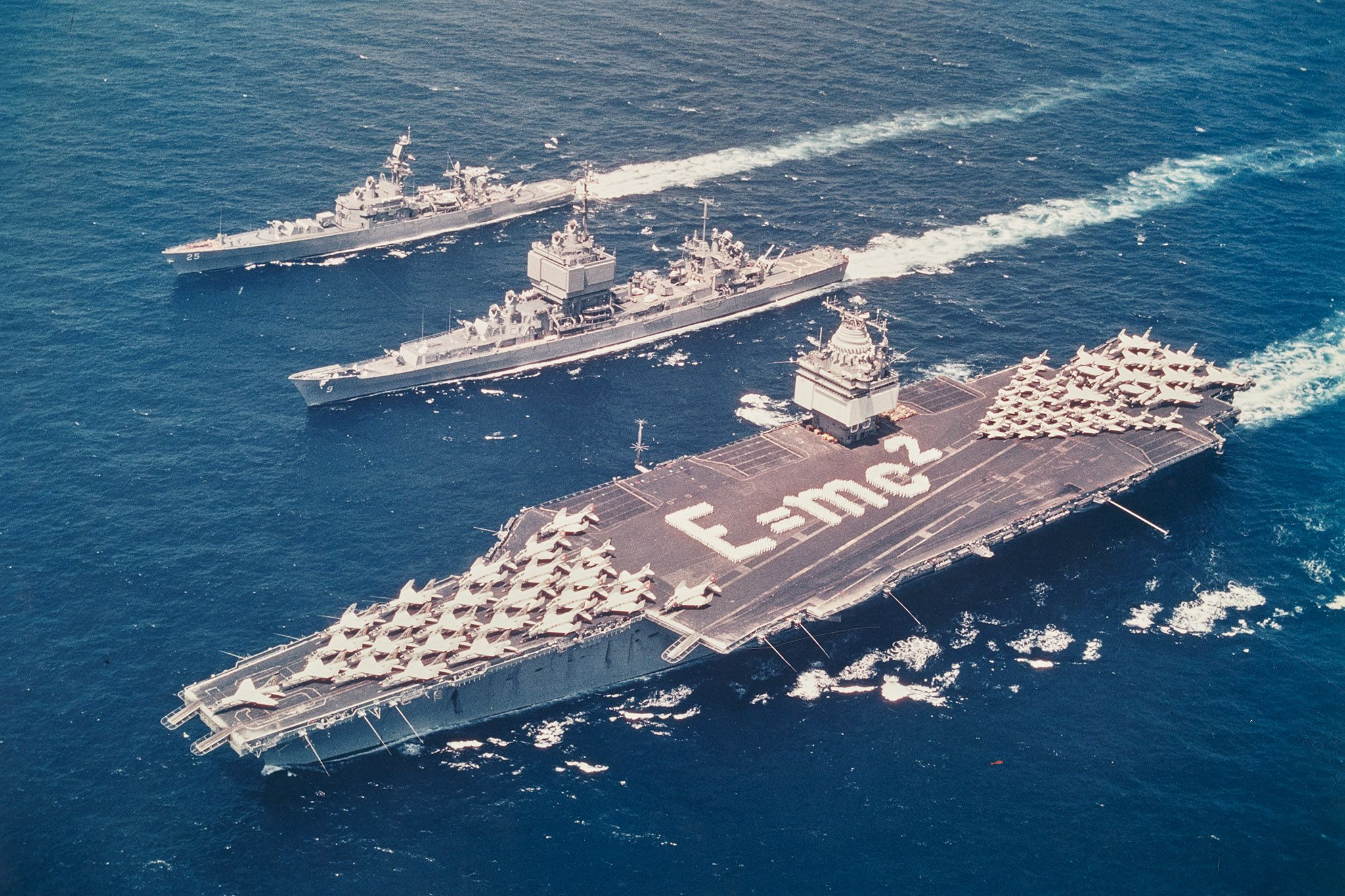
Operation "Sea Orbit" – Bainbridge (top), Long Beach (center) and Enterprise (bottom) in 1964

In October 1965, Bainbridge again rounded Cape Agulhas, en route to the Western Pacific for the first of eleven Seventh Fleet cruises. Operating for much of this deployment off strife-torn Vietnam, she screened aircraft carriers, served as a radar-picket ship, and performed search and rescue missions. In June, the frigate crossed the Pacific to her new home port, Long Beach, California. Her next five Far Eastern tours, in 1966–67, 1969, 1970, 1971 and 1972–73, also involved Vietnam War combat operations, as well as voyages to Australia and, beginning in 1970, the Indian Ocean. In 1967–1968, Bainbridge underwent shipyard overhaul and her first nuclear refueling. The ship's seventh trip to the Far East, beginning in November 1973, included a lengthy visit to the Indian Ocean and Arabian Sea, a locale that would become very familiar in the coming decades.

Bainbridge received an extensive modernization and refueling between June 1974 and September 1976, with post-overhaul work lasting until April 1977. While in the shipyard, at the end of June 1975, she was reclassified from frigate (destroyer leader) to cruiser, receiving the new designation CGN-25. Her next Seventh Fleet deployment ran from January to August 1978 and included visits throughout the region, from Japan and South Korea to Thailand and Singapore, with her homeward-bound voyage taking her to Australia and through the South Pacific. Bainbridge made three more WestPac tours, in 1979–80, 1981 and 1982–83, each involving extensive operations in the Indian Ocean and Arabian Sea.

== 1980s–1990s ==
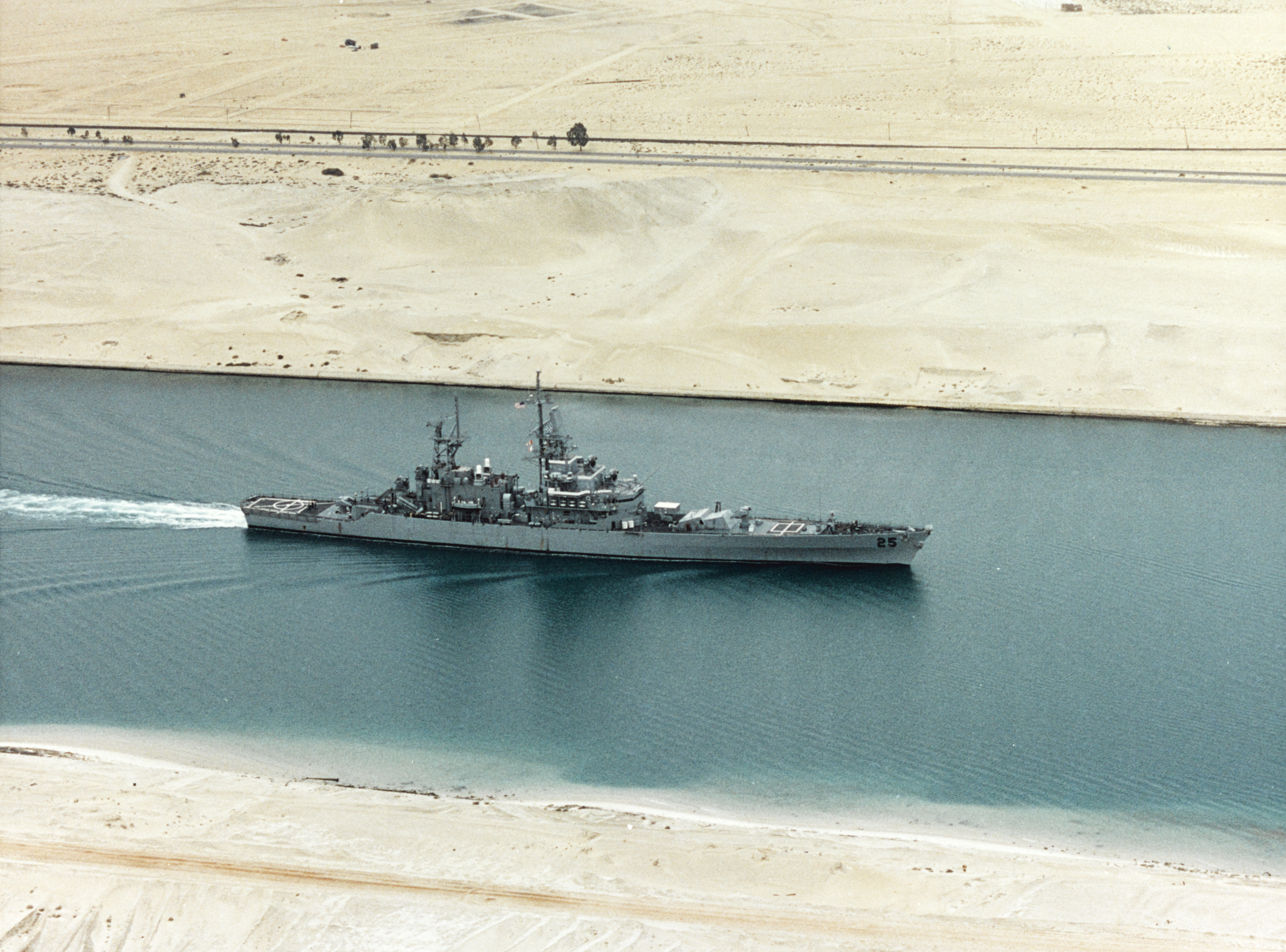
Bainbridge in the Suez Canal

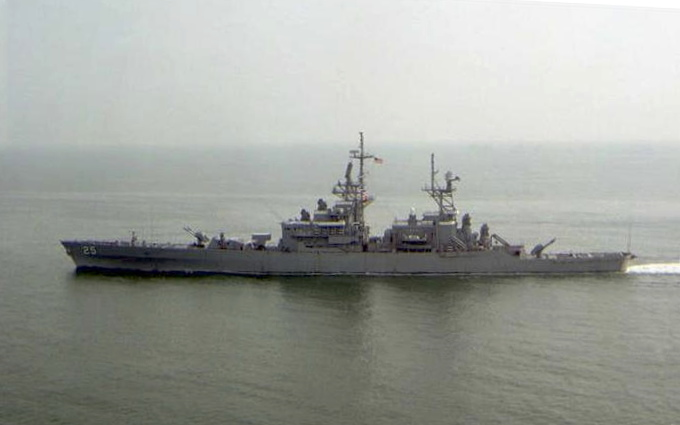
Bainbridge circa 1991

In 1982 she won the Marjorie Sterrett Battleship Fund Award.

After receiving her final nuclear refueling overhaul in 1983–85, Bainbridge left the Pacific after two decades, transited the Panama Canal and rejoined the U.S. Atlantic Fleet. Her operations thereafter included counter-drug smuggling patrols in the Caribbean, several deployments to northern European waters and four Mediterranean cruises 1986–87, 1988–89—including combat operations off Libya, 1991–92—with a Red Sea and Persian Gulf tour, and 1994 as Standing Naval Force Atlantic (STANAVFORLANT).

The 1994 deployment supported United Nations resolutions that became part of Operation Sharp Guard, which enforced sanctions against the Former Republic of Yugoslavia. During these operations, she safely conducted over 100 boardings of merchant vessels to inspect for illegal cargo shipments. Bainbridge also supported Operation Deny Flight, where she acted as "REDCROWN" coordinating the air warfare environment over Bosnia. Bainbridge's AAW suite could provide almost complete radar coverage of the airspace over Bosnia and the Adriatic. With her SM-2 ER missiles, she could engage more than 16 aircraft or cruise missiles simultaneously; and at ranges in excess of 75 nautical miles (139 km).

== Decommissioning ==
Deactivated in October 1995, Bainbridge was officially decommissioned in September 1996. She was towed to Bremerton, Washington in mid-1997, and in October of that year entered dry dock to begin "recycling," the process by which nuclear-powered warships are scrapped.

== Honors and awards ==
Bainbridge has been awarded the following decorations;

- Joint Meritorious Unit Award (2) - Navy
- Meritorious Unit Commendation
- Meritorious Unit Commendation (2) - Coast Guard
- Navy Battle "E" Ribbon (5)
- Navy Expeditionary Medal
- National Defense Service Medal (2)
- Armed Forces Expeditionary Medal
- Vietnam Service Medal (8)
- Southwest Asia Service Medal (1)
- Humanitarian Service Medal
- Sea Service Deployment Ribbon (9)
- Coast Guard Special Operations Service Ribbon
- Republic of Vietnam Gallantry Cross Unit Citation
- Republic of Vietnam Civil Action 1st Class Unit Citation
- Republic of Vietnam Campaign Medal
- Kuwait Liberation Medal (Kuwait)
- Bainbridge has also earned eight battle stars for Vietnam service.

Unit awards

== See also ==
- List of cruisers of the United States Navy
- Nuclear powered cruisers of the United States Navy
