= Bainbridge, British Columbia =

Coordinates: 49.317°N 124.850°W

Bainbridge (population approximately 337) is a locality in British Columbia. Its elevation is 5,395 ft.
