= Helen Benbridge =

American suffragist

Helen C. Benbridge
- Born: December 8, 1876; Lafayette, Indiana
- Died: November 11, 1964; Terre Haute, Indiana
- Known for: Women's Suffrage Movement
- Parents: Thomas T. Benbridge; Elizabeth Benbridge

Helen Colemen Benbridge (1876–1964) was an American suffragist, who was active in the Women's Right's Movement in Indiana in the early 20th century. Benbridge was elected president of The Women League of Voters in Vigo County, where she worked as an advocate for Hoosier women after the 19th amendment was passed in the United States.

== Early life and education ==
Helen Benbridge was born on December 8, 1876, in Lafayette, Indiana, and died on November 11, 1964, in Terre Haute, Indiana. Benbridge was born to Thomas T. Benbridge and Elizabeth Jones. She had one brother named Richard W. Benbridge.

Benbridge spent most of her life at 213 North 7th Street in Terre Haute. She was a student until 1904 when she began working as the society reporter at a local Terre Haute newspaper called the Tribune. In 1908, she worked as a court reporter and in 1910 she worked as part of the editorial staff for the newspaper.

== Suffrage ==
Benbridge was very involved in women's suffrage in Vigo County, as she was one of the founding members of The League of Women Voters in Terre Haute. The League of Women voters was founded by Carrie Chapman Catt in 1920. Along with being a founder of The League of Women Voters, Benbridge was the president of the Women's Franchise League of Indiana.

The Women's Franchise League of Indiana Headquarters were located at 605 Trust Building, Terre Haute, Indiana. Under her presidency, the participation in the organization grew so rapidly that only four counties in Indiana did not have any kind of representation of the league. Benbridge's leadership lead to many new members and expanded the organization. Benbridge worked as president to consolidate the gains women had made when receiving the right to vote and encouraging them to continue to use their right to vote to further progress. Benbridge, along with the other league presidents, did not receive a salary for her hard work and efforts.

== Later life ==
In 1924, she worked as a secretary for the Indiana State Normal School (presently Indiana State University), and then she worked as the Deputy Assessor for Harrison Township in 1936. In 1937, she was the vice president of B A Inc., partnered with her brother, Richard Benbridge. B A Inc., was an electrical company from when she ran out of the back of her house. In 1949, she worked as the treasurer of the City Board of Cemetery Regents.

Benbridge died on November 11, 1964, at 87 years old and was buried at Old Hickman Funeral Home in Terre Haute, Indiana. The cause of her death was concluded to be pulmonary edema and generalized arteriosclerosis. Her medical certificate of death through the Indiana State Board of Health notes that her usual occupation was a housekeeper. She never married.
