= Margaretta M. Lovell =

American art historian

Margaretta M. Lovell is an American art historian who serves as the Jay D. McEvoy, Jr. Professor of the History of Art at the University of California, Berkeley. Her research and teaching center on the art and history of the United States, including eighteenth- and nineteenth-century landscape painting, portraiture, decorative arts, furniture, architecture, food, and forests.

== Biography ==
Lovell received a B.A. in English from Smith College, an M.A. from the University of Delaware's joint program in Early American Culture with the Winterthur Museum, and a Ph.D. in American Studies from Yale University.

Institutions where she has held faculty appointments include Yale, Harvard University, the University of Michigan, College of William & Mary, and Stanford University in addition to Berkeley. She has held fellowships from the John Simon Guggenheim Memorial Foundation, the Rockefeller Foundation, the National Endowment for the Humanities, The Huntington Library, and the Terra Foundation for American Art among others.

== Awards ==
Honors she has received include, for Art in a Season of Revolution, the Charles C. Eldredge Prize for Distinguished Scholarship in American Art and the 2007 Historians of British Art Prize, and, for A Visitable Past, the Ralph Henry Gabriel Prize of the American Studies Association. The American Antiquarian Society elected her to honorary membership in recognition of scholarly distinction in 2001. She has been recognized for her teaching at both institutional and national levels, receiving UC Berkeley's 2009 Faculty Award for Outstanding Mentorship of Graduate Student Instructors and the College Art Association's 2014 Distinguished Teaching of Art History Award, the profession's highest honor for pedagogy.

== Books ==
- Painting the Inhabited Landscape: Fitz H. Lane and the Global Reach of Antebellum New England (Penn State University Press, 2023).
- A Material World: Culture, Society, and the Life of Things in Early Anglo-America (edited with George W. Boudreau, Penn State University Press, 2019).
- Art in a Season of Revolution: The Artist, the Artisan, and the Patron in Early America (University of Pennsylvania Press, 2005).
- A Visitable Past: Views of Venice by American Artists 1860–1915 (University of Chicago Press, 1989).
- Venice: The American View, 1860–1920 (Fine Arts Museums of San Francisco & University of Washington Press, 1984), exhibit catalog.
- American Painting 1730–1960: A Selection from the Collection of Mr. and Mrs. John D. Rockefeller 3rd (Japan Society & Fine Arts Museums of San Francisco, 1982), exhibit catalog.
