= Henry Benbridge =

American painter (1743–1812)

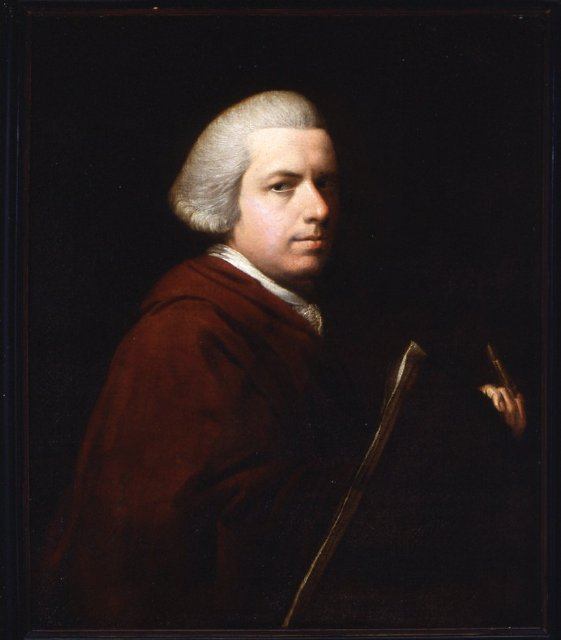
Self-portrait of Benbridge

Henry Benbridge (October 1743 – February 1812) was an American painter who specialized in portrait painting.

== Early life and education ==
He was born in Philadelphia, the only child of James and Mary (Clark) Benbridge. When he was seven years old, his mother, who had been left a widow, was married to Thomas Gordon, a wealthy Scot. The boy's artistic talent was encouraged. He made decorative designs for his stepfather's drawing-room which were much admired. When he was fourteen years old he may have watched John Wollaston paint Gordon's portrait. It has been plausibly argued that young Benbridge had instruction from Wollaston, since his earliest known portrait, that of his half-sister Rebecca Gordon, "seems to hark back to Wollaston." When he was 21, Benbridge was sent to Italy, where he studied with Pompeo Batoni and Anton Raphael Mengs.

== Sojourn in England ==
In 1769, on commission from James Boswell, biographer of Dr. Samuel Johnson, he made a portrait of Pasquale Paoli in Corsica which he took to London. It was exhibited (1769) at the Free Society of Artists, and from it three mezzotints were scraped and published with the artist's name signed "Bembridge." Like other young Americans he was encouraged by Benjamin West. He wrote, on December 7, 1769, to his stepfather: "Upon my arrival I waited upon Mr. West who received me with a sort of brotherly affection, as did my cousin, Mrs. West." Impelled, apparently, by a longing to rejoin his family, he left England in 1770, bearing from West the following note of recommendation to Francis Hopkinson: "By Mr. Benbridge you will receive these few lines. You will find him an Ingenous artist and an agreeable Companion. His merit in the art must procure him great incouragement and much esteem. I deare say it will give you great pleasure to have an ingenous artist resident amongst you."

== Mature career ==
In Philadelphia Benbridge married Hetty Sage and was admitted on January 18, 1771, to membership in the American Philosophical Society, of which Benjamin Franklin was a founder. He painted the large portrait of the Gordon family, with six figures, one of his masterpieces. Suffering, however, from asthma, he sought a more congenial climate and moved to Charleston, South Carolina, where he succeeded Jeremiah Theus (d. May 18, 1774) as the popular portrait painter of South Carolina. There he made many likenesses of southern men and women, several of which have been popularly attributed to John Singleton Copley, an artist who never painted in the South and who left America in 1774.

Around 1800 Benbridge settled in Norfolk, Virginia, whence he made frequent visits to his native city. At Norfolk he gave to Thomas Sully his first lessons in oil painting. He had previously instructed Thomas Coram of Charleston. Sully describes his master as "a portly man of good address–gentlemanly in his deportment." Benbridge's health is said by Hart to have declined in middle age. Dunlap's assertion that his last years were passed "in obscurity and poverty" has been disputed.

== Artistic style and reputation ==
As a technician Benbridge drew well and painted solidly, exhibiting many characteristics of the late Italian masters. His contemporary Charles Fraser (quoted by Dunlap) said that "his shadows were dark and opaque and more suitable to the historical style." Hart says "Benbridge was impregnated by the brownish sameness of Batoni's palette and his shadows were too opaque, and although later he was somewhat emancipated from these errors, all his work belongs to the late Italian school." His paintings, nevertheless, were notably good in respect of their black-and-white values and some of his miniatures are exquisite. His Italianate mode was much appreciated in the Mid-Atlantic and Southern states during his lifetime.

== Gallery ==
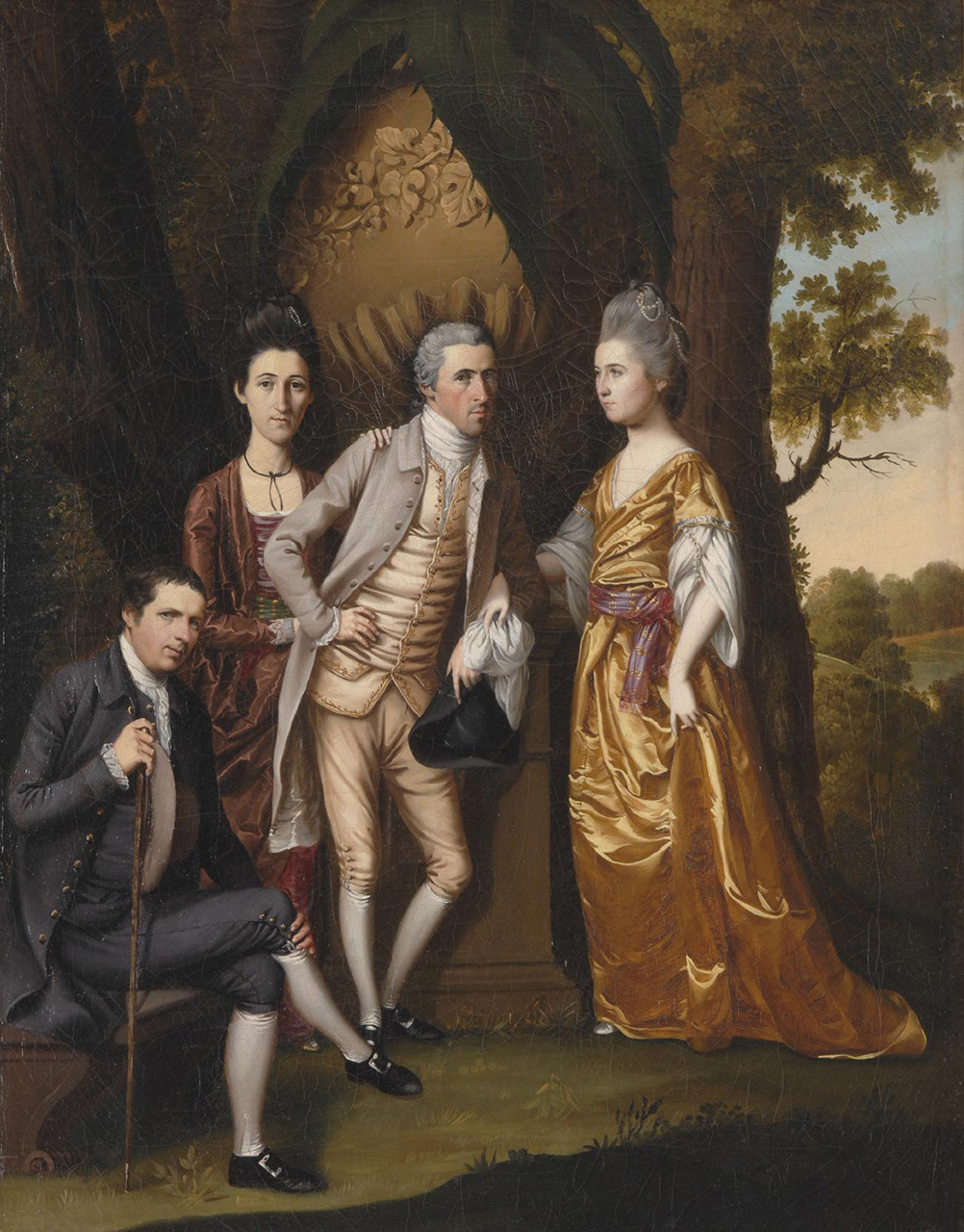
"Enoch Edwards Family 1779" by Henry Benbridge. Benbridge is seated at left. His half-sister, Frances Gordon, at right, is shown with her husband Dr. Enoch Edwards. The dark haired woman is Enoch Edwards' niece. Philadelphia Museum of Art

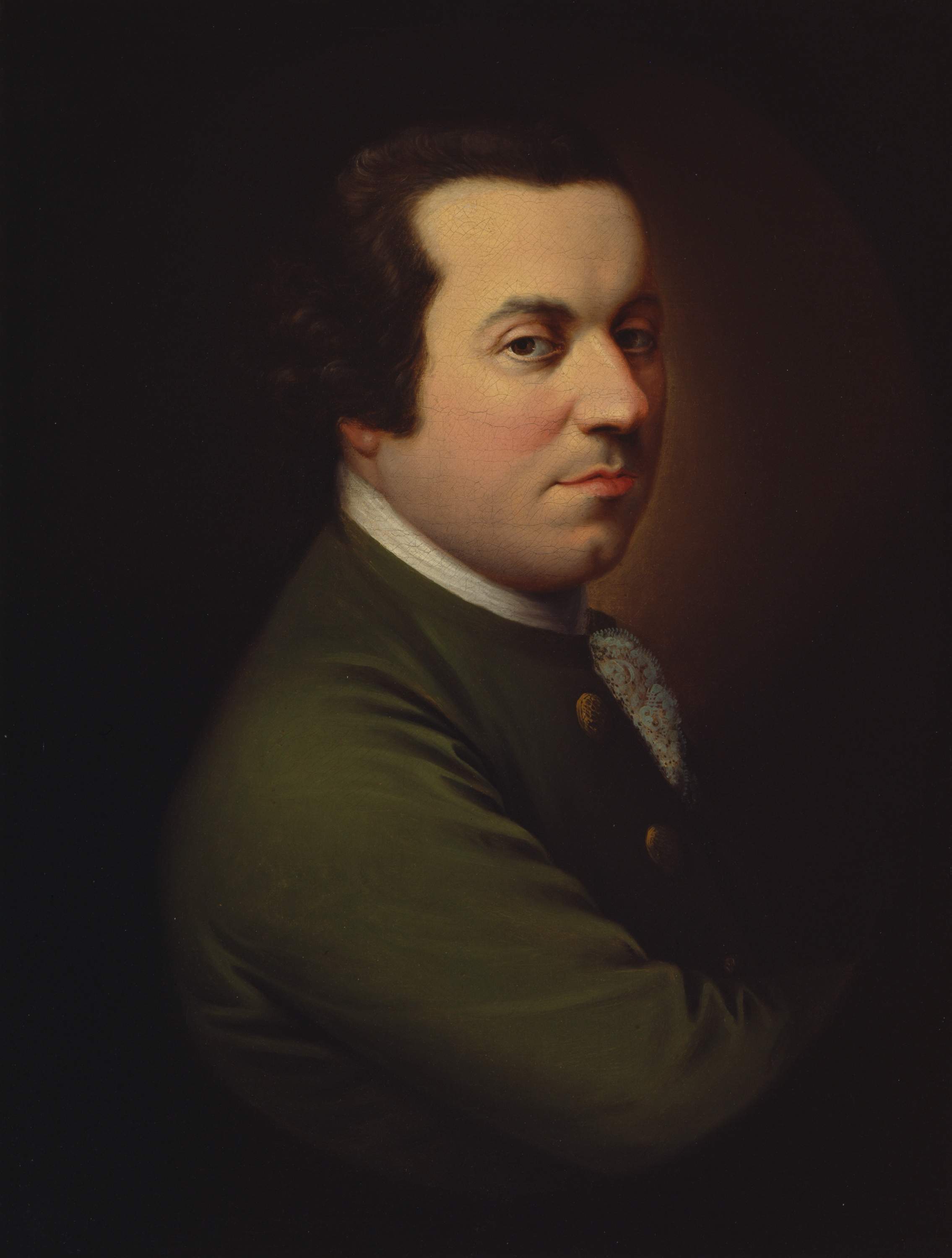
Dr. Jonathan Potts (1745-1781), oil on canvas of 1770/1776, in the Art Institute of Chicago

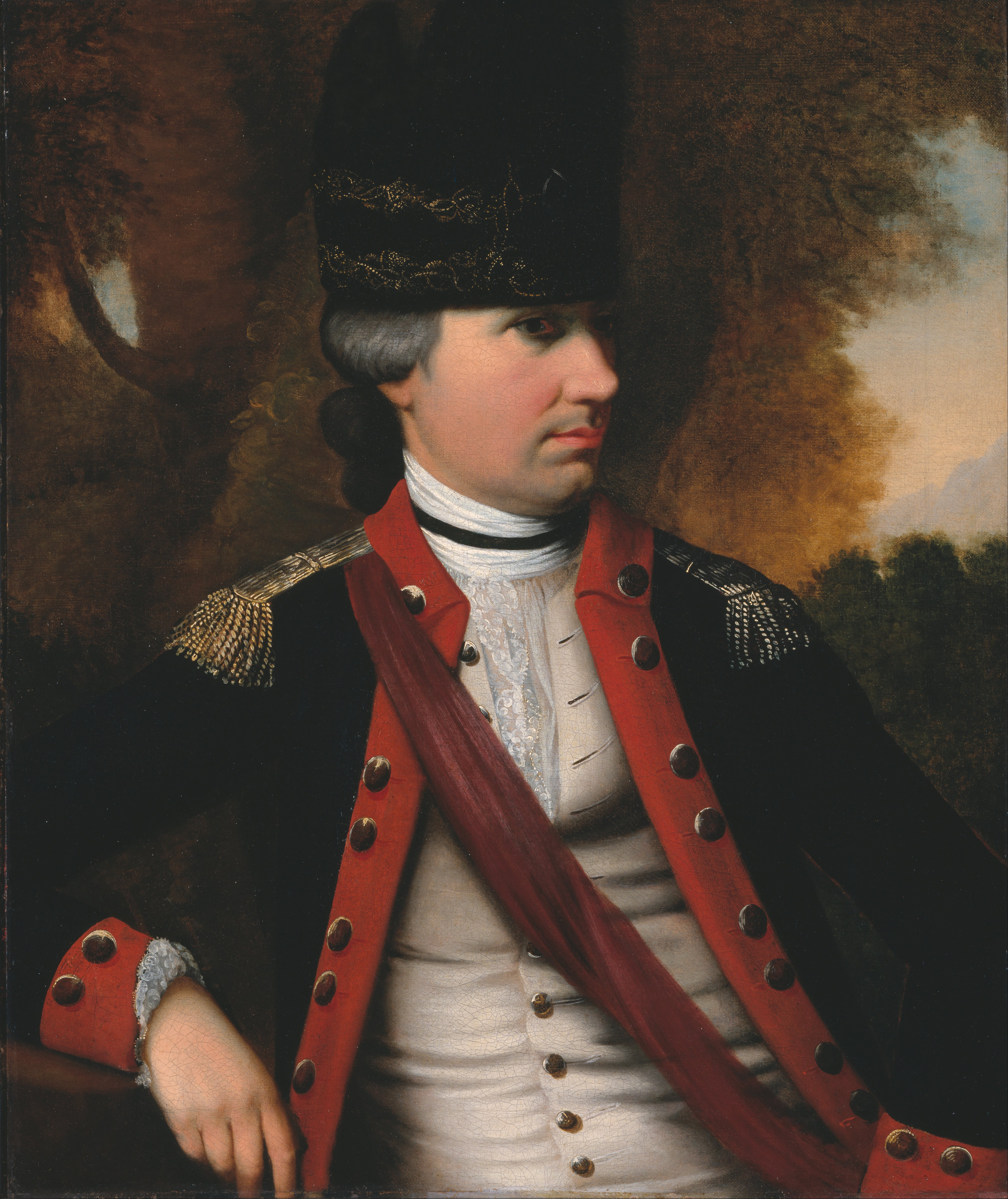
Charles Cotesworth Pinckney by Benbridge

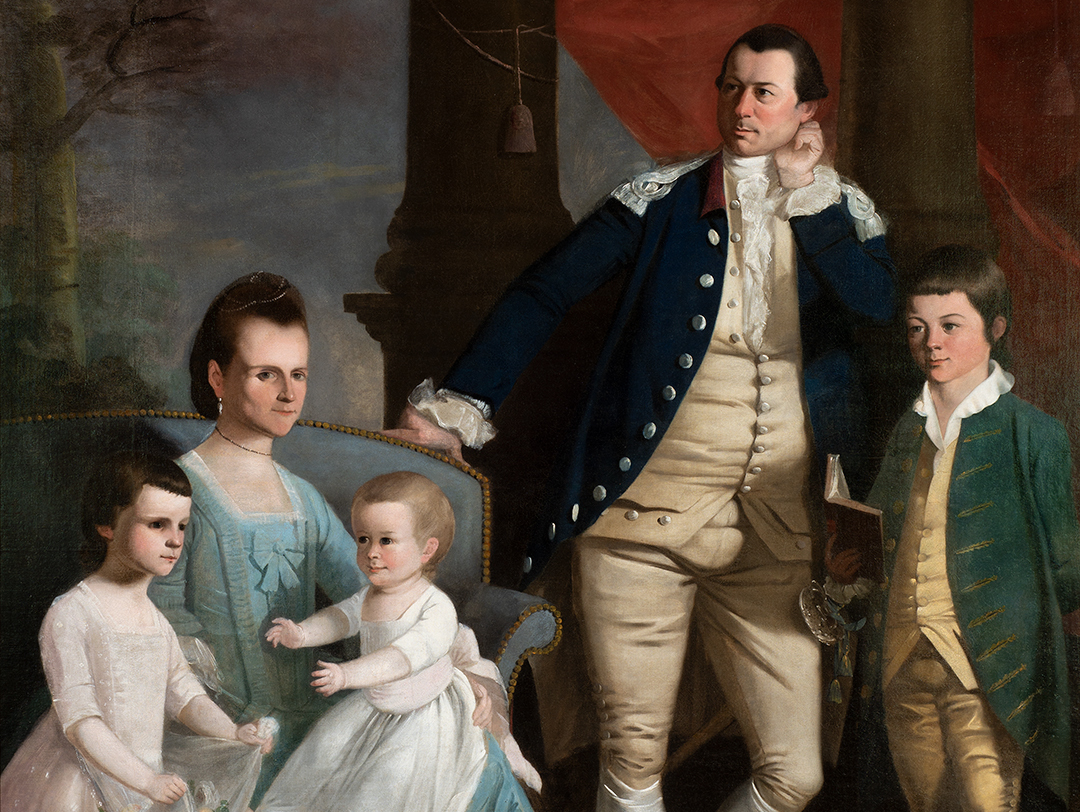
The Archibald Bulloch Family, c. 1775

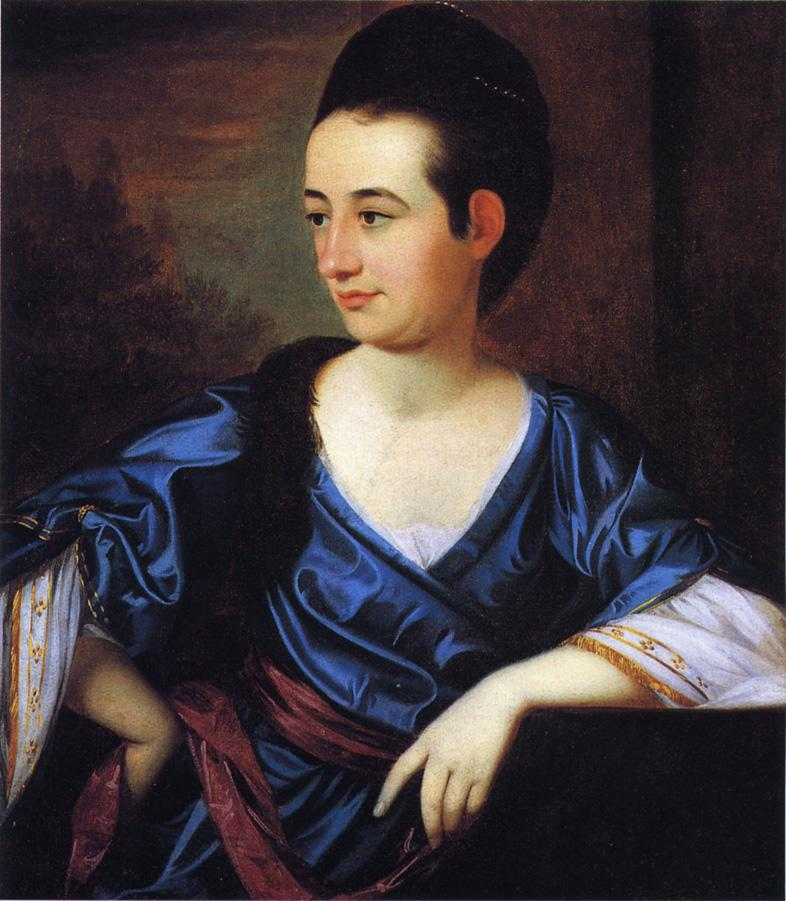
Mrs. William Allston, Jr., oil on canvas, circa 1784, Museum of Early Southern Decorative Arts

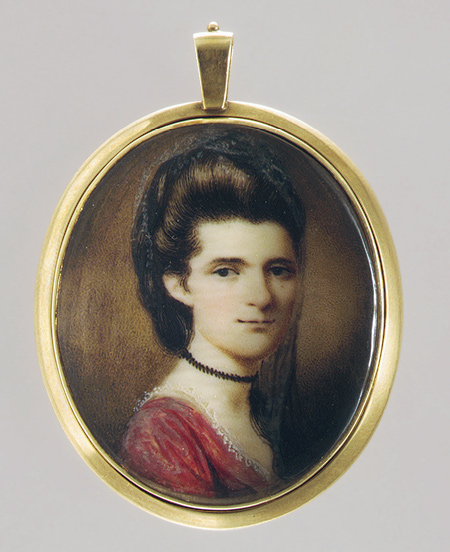
Elizabeth Ann Timothy (Mrs. William Williamson), watercolor on ivory of 1775

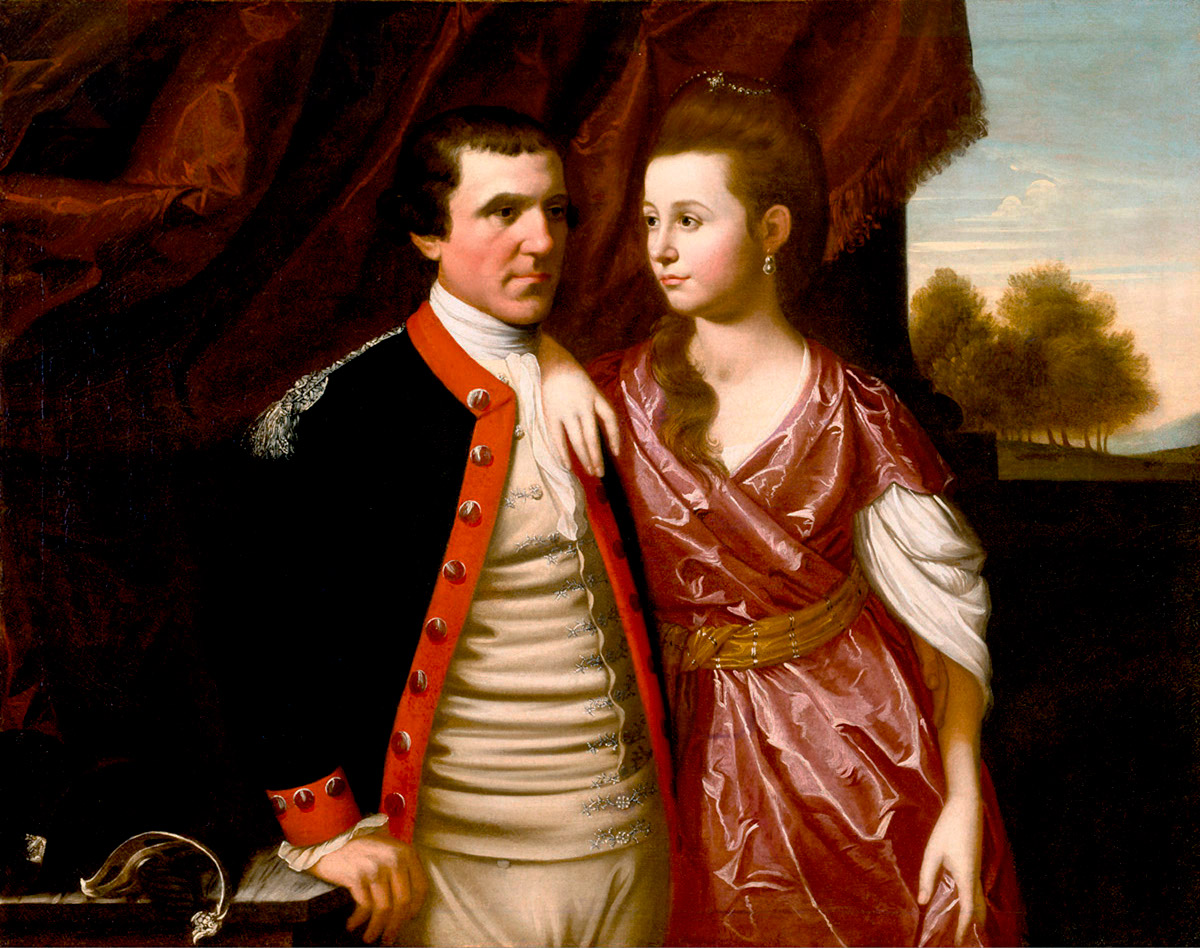
Captain John Purves and His Wife, Eliza Anne Pritchard, oil on canvas, 1775, Winterthur Museum

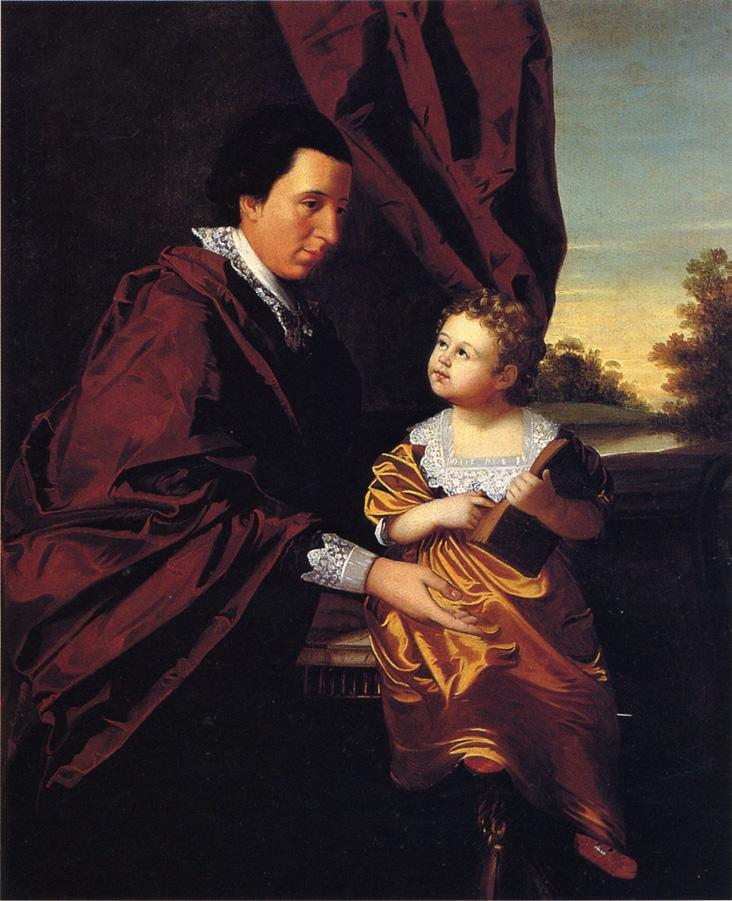
Thomas Middleton of Crowfield and His Daughter Mary, oil on canvas, c. 1776, Historic Charleston Foundation

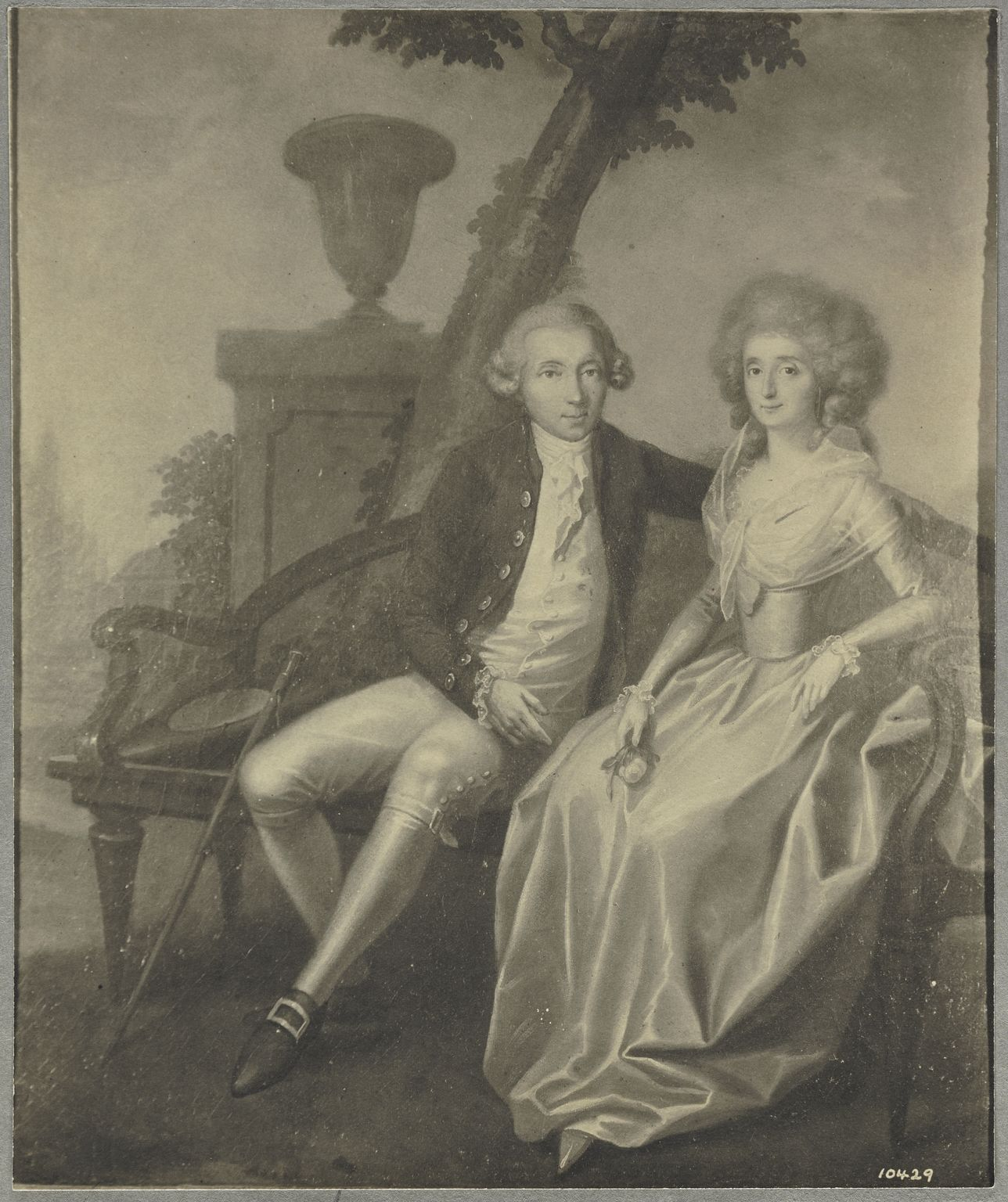
Aaron Burr with his wife Theodosia Bartow Burr, oil on canvas, c. 1780s or 1790s
