= Jimmy Hanlon =

English footballer

John James Hanlon (12 October 1917 – 12 January 2002) was an English footballer who played as a forward. He was signed as a trainee for Manchester United in 1934 and became a professional one year later. In 1948, he was transferred to Bury. In 63 matches for Manchester United, he scored 20 goals.
