= Bainbridge Township =

Bainbridge Township may refer to the following places in the US:

- Bainbridge Township, Schuyler County, Illinois
- Bainbridge Township, Dubois County, Indiana
- Bainbridge Township, Berrien County, Michigan
- Bainbridge Township, Geauga County, Ohio
