= Bob Bainbridge =

English footballer

Personal information
- Full name: Robert Bainbridge
- Date of birth: 5 January 1897
- Place of birth: Jarrow, County Durham, England
- Date of death: 1967 (aged 69–70)
- Height: 6 ft 0 in (1.83 m)
- Position: Goalkeeper

Senior career*
Years	Team	Apps	(Gls)
- Jarrow
1920–1922	Lincoln City	72	(0)
- Sittingbourne
- Gateshead Town
- Leadgate Park
- * Club domestic league appearances and goals

Robert Bainbridge (5 January 1897 – 1967) was an English footballer who made 35 appearances in the Football League playing for Lincoln City. He played as a goalkeeper. He also played 37 times for Lincoln in the Midland League, and played non-league football for Jarrow, Sittingbourne, Gateshead Town and Leadgate Park.
