= John Bainbridge (Royal Navy officer) =

Irish cricketer and Royal Navy officer

Rear-Admiral John Bainbridge JP
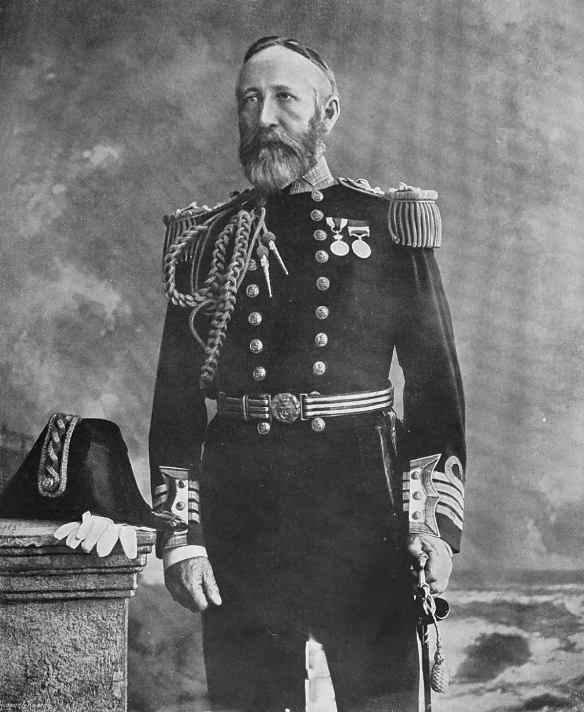
- Bainbridge c.1898
- Born: 31 May 1845; Mallow, County Cork, Ireland
- Died: 10 August 1901 (aged 56) at sea off Bergen, Norway
- Cricket career

Cricket information
- Batting: Unknown

Domestic team information
- Years: Team
- 1882: Marylebone Cricket Club

Career statistics
Competition	First-class
Matches	1
Runs scored	0
Batting average	0.00
100s/50s	–/–
Top score	0
Catches/stumpings	–/–
- Source: Cricinfo, 10 November 2020

John Hugh Bainbridge JP (31 May 1845 – 10 August 1901) was an Irish Royal Navy officer and first-class cricketer.

The son of John Hugh Bainbridge, he was born at Mallow, County Cork near Cork. He entered into service with the Royal Navy in 1859, seeing action in the final year of the Second Opium War. He gained the rank of sub-lieutenant in 1864, before being promoted to lieutenant in June 1866. Bainbridge served on HMY Victoria and Albert in the 1870s, gaining promotion to commander while aboard in August 1876.

In June 1885, he was promoted to captain. He commanded the cruiser HMS Forth in the 1890 annual manoeuvres. Bainbridge was appointed aide-de-camp to Queen Victoria in March 1897, replacing the promoted Arthur Dalrymple Fanshawe. He was promoted to rear admiral on 11 July 1899, vice John Fullerton. Bainbridge owned the steam ship SS Matador and purchased the yacht Vanadis in April 1901 from the 10th Earl of Wemyss. While sailing aboard Vanadis into Bergen on 9 August 1901, Bainbridge fell ill with apoplexy. He died at 5am the next morning. Besides his naval career, he had also served as a justice of the peace for County Cork.

== Cricket ==
He made a single appearance in first-class cricket when he played for the Marylebone Cricket Club (MCC) against Hampshire at Southampton in 1882. He was dismissed without scoring by Charles Young in both MCC innings'.
