= David Bainbridge (scientist) =

British writer

- Born: October 30, 1968 (age 57); Essex
- Education: Brentwood School
- Alma mater: University of Cambridge
- Occupations: Reproductive biologist and veterinary anatomist
- Writing career
- Subject: Science
- Notable work: A Visitor Within: The Science of Pregnancy
- Notable awards: American Association of Medical Writers' Prize

David Robert James Bainbridge (born 30 October 1968) is a science writer, reproductive biologist and veterinary anatomist at the University of Cambridge.

His research work has centred on several aspects of pregnancy, including maternal recognition of pregnancy, in vitro fertilization and the immunology of pregnancy in animals and humans. He has also published a variety of books on the X chromosome, the evolution of the brain and teenagers.

== Biography ==
David Bainbridge was born in Essex. He began his education at Brentwood School (England) between 1976 and 1986. He then trained as a veterinary surgeon at the University of Cambridge, as a student of Emmanuel College, Cambridge. His research career included a PhD at the Institute of Zoology (1993–1996) in London, short stints at Cornell University and further work at the University of Oxford (1996–1999) and Royal Veterinary College (1999–2003).

In 2003, he was appointed Clinical Veterinary Anatomist at the University of Cambridge, and a Fellow of St Catharine's College, Cambridge.

== Science ==
Bainbridge's first book, A Visitor Within: The Science of Pregnancy (published in the US as Making Babies) was first published in 2000.

Other books followed, including The X in Sex: How the X Chromosome Controls Our Lives in 2003, which won the American Association of Medical Writers' Prize and Beyond the Zonules of Zinn: (Note: See Zonule of Zinn) A Fantastic Journey Through Your Brain in 2008. In these, Bainbridge expanded his interests in the evolutionary basis of human biology and behaviour, a trend which continued in 2009, with the publication of Teenagers: A Natural History - a 'zoological' look at the vagaries of human adolescence in which he argued that teenagers are the pinnacle of human existence. Curvology: the Origins and Power of Female Body Shape appeared in 2015.
