= William Bainbridge =

United States Navy officer (1774–1833)

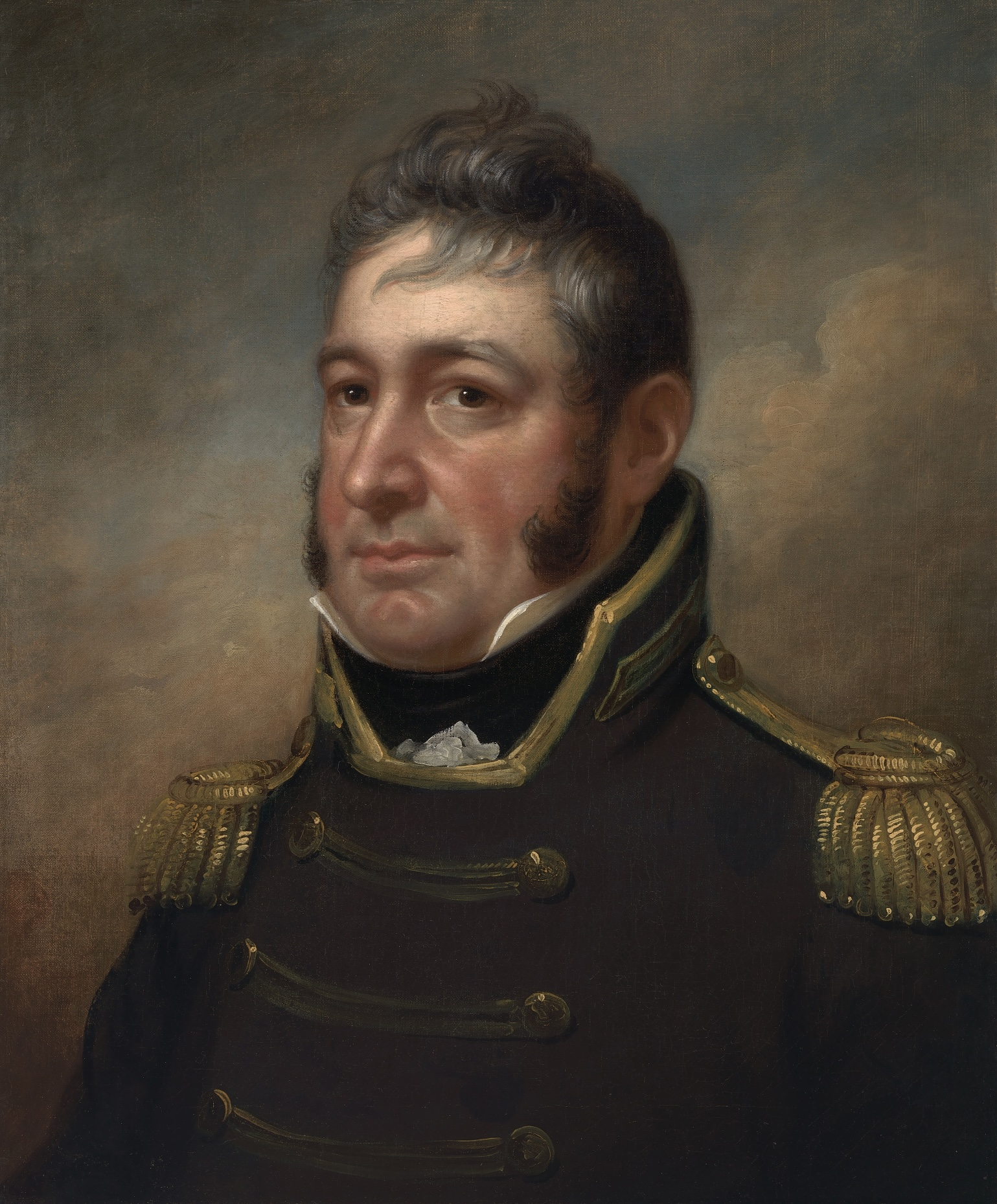
- Portrait by Rembrandt Peale, c. 1814
- Born: May 7, 1774; Princeton, Province of New Jersey, British America
- Died: July 27, 1833 (aged 59); Philadelphia, Pennsylvania, U.S.
- Burial place: Christ Church Burial Ground, Philadelphia, Pennsylvania
- Military career
- Branch: United States Navy
- Service years: 1798–1833
- Rank: Commodore
- Commands: USS Retaliation; USS Norfolk; USS George Washington; USS Philadelphia; USS President; USS Constitution; USS Columbus
- Conflicts: Quasi War; Capture of USS Retaliation; First Barbary War; War of 1812; Second Barbary War
- Awards: Congressional Gold Medal

Commodore William Bainbridge (May 7, 1774 – July 27, 1833) was a United States Navy officer. During his long career in the young American navy he served under six presidents beginning with John Adams and is notable for his many victories at sea. He commanded several famous naval ships, including the USS Constitution, and saw service in the Barbary Wars and the War of 1812. Bainbridge was also in command of the USS Philadelphia when she grounded off the shores of Tripoli, Libya in North Africa, resulting in his capture and imprisonment for many months. In the latter part of his career he became the U.S. Naval Commissioner.

== Early life ==
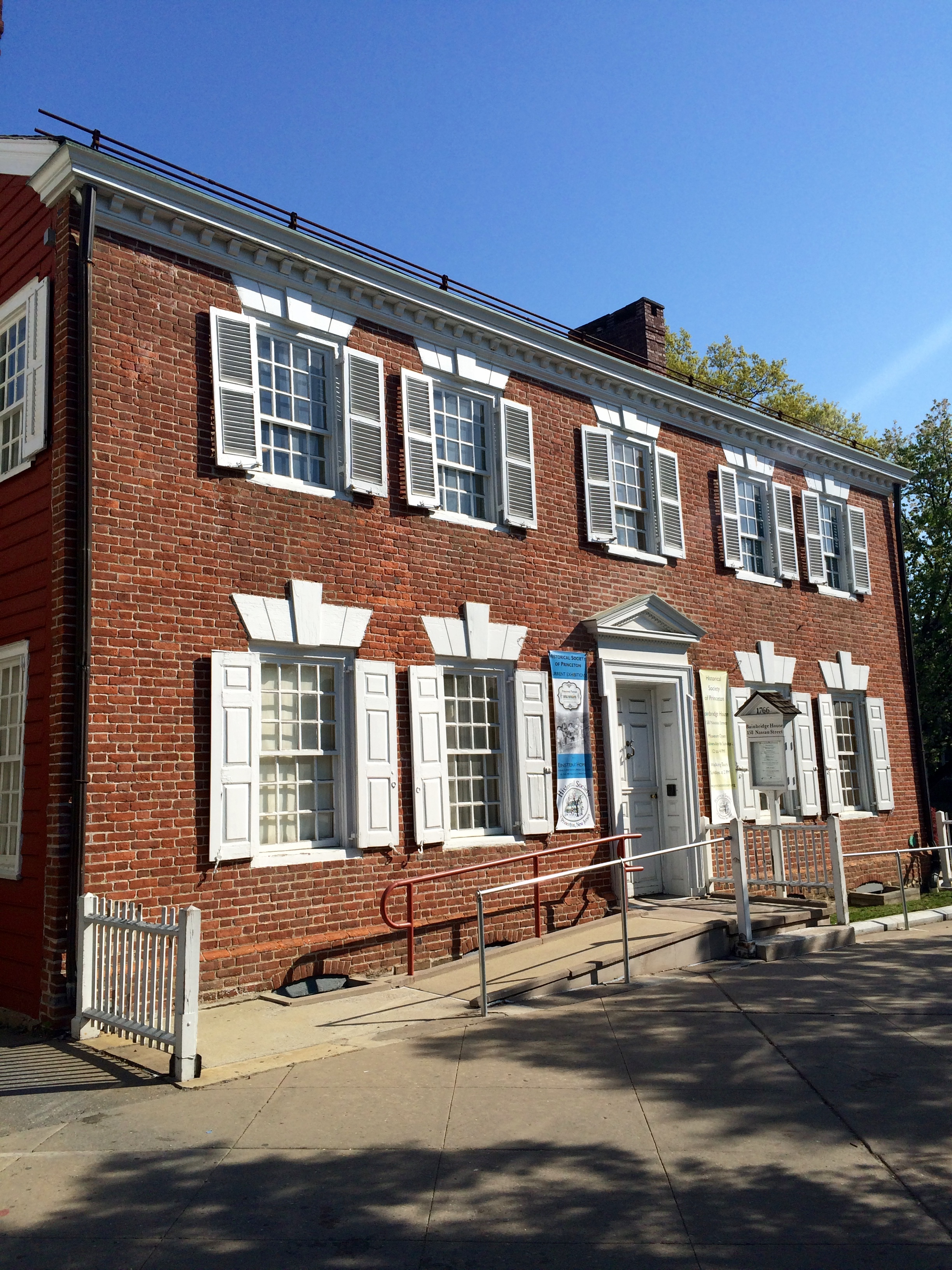
Bainbridge House in Princeton, New Jersey, the commodore's birthplace.

William Bainbridge was born in Princeton, New Jersey, eldest son of Dr. Absalom Bainbridge and Mary Taylor. His father, a loyalist during the American Revolution, served as a surgeon in the British Army and was convicted of high treason by the State of New Jersey and successfully filed for damages with the American Loyalist Claims Commission. William had two brothers: Joseph, who also became a Navy captain, and John T.; and a sister, Mary. He was raised by his maternal grandfather, John Taylor, Esq., of Middleton, New Jersey as his father left for England in 1783 and his mother remained behind due to her ill health (though his father returned to the United States and died in New York City in 1807).

== Pre-naval service ==
In his teens William Bainbridge was already of athletic build and had an energetic and adventurous spirit. He was trained as a seaman in ships in the Delaware River, then considered the best 'school' for seamanship because of the great skill required to navigate that river.

Bainbridge served aboard the small merchant ship Cantor in 1792.

In 1796 after returning from Brazil, Bainbridge served aboard the merchant ship Hope, a small vessel of 140 tons with four nine-pound guns. While he was in port in the Garonne River at Bordeaux preparing for his fourth voyage, the captain of a nearby ship which was under mutiny hailed Bainbridge and asked for help; though outnumbered by seven seamen and being severely wounded by exploding gunpowder, Bainbridge succeeded in helping restore order. For his courage and in recognition of his navigational and seaman skills he was made commander of that ship in 1796 at the age of nineteen.

After leaving France that same year he sailed to the Caribbean. While in port at St. Johns, Hope was hailed by a British merchant schooner, but refused to stop. The schooner fired at Hope in response, and Bainbridge and his crew quickly turned about and with only two guns fired a broadside, inflicting enough damage that led the schooner to strike its colors.

== Service in U.S. Navy ==
Bainbridge saw service in several wars and commanded a number of famous early U.S. Navy vessels including USS George Washington, USS Philadelphia, and USS Constitution, ultimately becoming a member of the board of naval commissioners during the latter part of his long naval career.

=== Quasi-War ===
With the organization of the United States Navy in 1798, Bainbridge was included in the naval officer corps and in September 1798 was appointed commanding lieutenant of the schooner USS Retaliation. He was ordered to patrol the waters in the West Indies along with Captain Williams of USS Norfolk, both of whom were under the command of Murray, who was in command of the frigate USS Montezuma. On November 20, 1798, Lt. Bainbridge surrendered Retaliation without resistance to two French frigates, Volontier with 44 guns and l'Insurgente with 40 guns, after he mistook them for British warships and approached them without identifying them. Bainbridge and his crew were taken aboard Volontier where the two French frigates continued in their pursuit of other nearby American vessels. During the flight to capture the Americans, Bainbridge offered words of caution to the French commander of L' Insurgente, Captain St. Laurent, about American strength; this made St. Laurent wait for his consorts far behind him.

Retaliation was the first ship in the nascent United States Navy to be surrendered. Bainbridge was not disciplined for this action.

In March 1799, Bainbridge was appointed Master Commandant of the brig USS Norfolk of 18 guns and ordered to cruise against the French.

=== First Barbary War ===
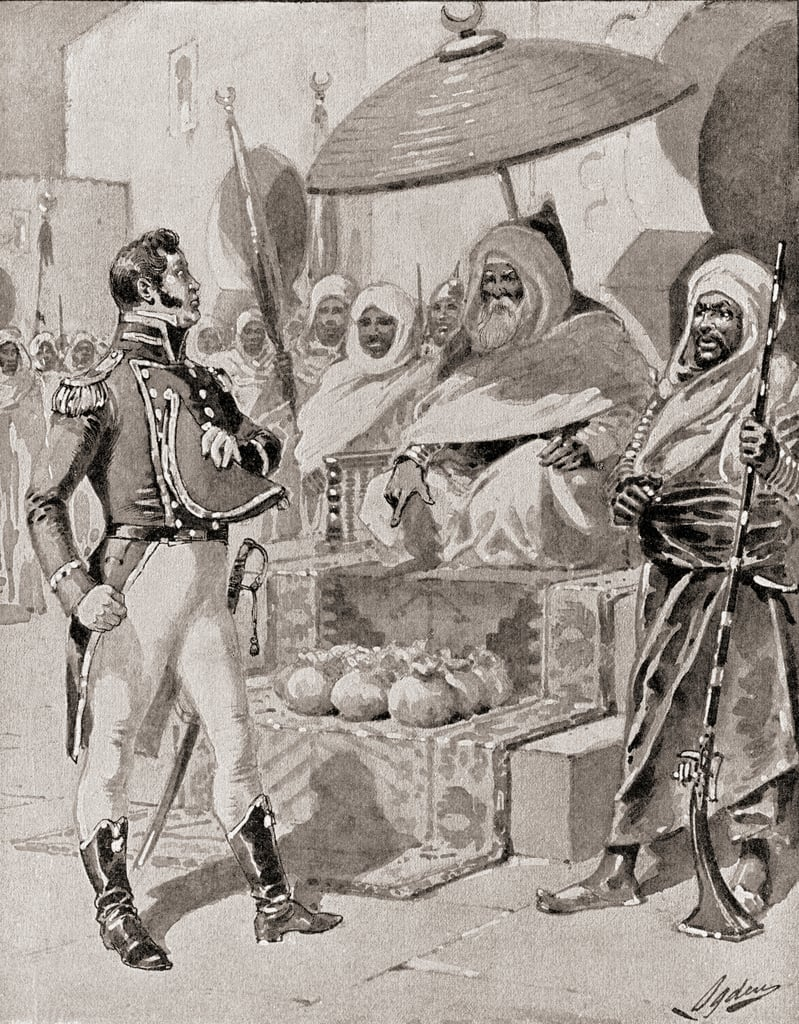
William Bainbridge pays tribute to the dey of Algiers

In 1800 during the months before the First Barbary War broke out, Bainbridge, who was now commanding officer of USS George Washington, was given the ignominious task of carrying the tribute which the United States still paid to the dey of Algiers to secure exemption from capture for U.S. merchant ships in the Mediterranean. Upon arrival in the 24-gun George Washington, he allowed the harbor pilot to guide him directly under the guns of the fort overlooking the harbor. Upon his arrival, the dey demanded that Bainbridge use his ship to ferry the Algerian ambassador and tributary gifts to Constantinople and that he fly the Algerian flag during the journey. With George Washington under the guns of the fort and surrounded by the dey's warships and military personnel, Bainbridge reluctantly complied for fear of imprisonment, raised the Algerian flag on his masthead, and delivered gifts of animals and slaves to Constantinople. After returning to the U.S. on 4 May 1801, he was relieved of command, and was succeeded by Lt. John Shaw as commanding officer. He commanded USS Essex on her second cruise, receiving command from Captain Preble on 29 May 1801,

President Jefferson found that bribing the pirate Barbary states did not work and decided to use force. On May 21, 1803, Bainbridge was placed in command of USS Philadelphia, tasked with enforcing a blockade of Tripoli, Libya. Bainbridge ran the ship aground on an uncharted reef on October 21, 1803. Bainbridge made the situation worse by putting on all sail before sounding around the boat to determine the actual situation, resulting in driving the ship hard onto the bank. After attempting to refloat her for five hours, while under cannon fire from Tripolitan gunboats—though no shots came near the powerful frigate—Bainbridge decided to surrender. Before doing so, he ordered all small arms thrown overboard, the powder magazine flooded, and the naval signal book destroyed. Soon afterward, the ship floated free after high tide and was captured by the Pasha of Tripoli. Bainbridge and his crewmen were imprisoned in Tripoli for nineteen months.

Lieutenant Stephen Decatur, commanding USS Intrepid, executed a night raid into Tripoli, Libya, harbor on February 16, 1804, to destroy Philadelphia. Admiral Horatio Nelson, 1st Viscount Nelson is said to have called this "the most bold and daring act of the Age".

The capture of Philadelphia and its crew also motivated President Jefferson's decision to send William Eaton, a former Army officer, known for his brash and defiant diplomacy, to Tripoli in 1805 to free the 300 American hostages in what was the first U.S. covert mission to overthrow a foreign government. William Eaton established a group of about 20 Christian (eight of whom were U.S. Marines) and perhaps 100 Muslim mercenaries to begin the takeover of Tripoli starting with Derna. He managed to trek with the small detachment of Marines led by Presley O'Bannon and his mercenary force over 500 miles. Supported at sea by Isaac Hull, commanding USS Argus, in an effective "combined operation", Eaton led the attack in the Battle of Derna on 27 April 1805. The town's capture, memorialized in the "Marines' Hymn" famous line "to the shores of Tripoli" and the threat of further advance on Tripoli, were strong influences toward peace, negotiated in June 1805 by Tobias Lear and Commodore John Rodgers with the Pasha of Tripoli.

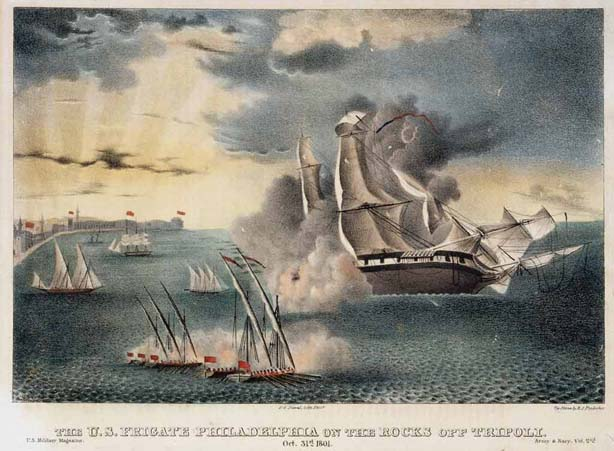
Philadelphia aground off Tripoli, in 1803

After four separate bombardments from Preble's squadron, Bainbridge was released from the prison in Tripoli on June 3, 1805, and returned to the United States and received a warm welcome. Shortly thereafter a Naval Court of Inquiry tasked with looking into his surrender found no evidence of misconduct, and he was allowed to continue serving. On his release, he returned for a time to the merchant service in order to make good the loss of profit caused by his captivity. With the conclusion of the campaign against the Barbary states, the US Navy was downsized and nearly all of her frigates remained in port. Realizing that war with the United Kingdom was imminent Bainbridge and Commodore Stewart hastened to Washington to urge President Jefferson and Congress to strengthen the country's naval forces. They concurred with this timely advice and Congress forced a change to this policy that had led the current naval force to decay in early 1809. Satisfied with the results Bainbridge returned to Boston and took command of the navy yard at Charlestown.

Bainbridge took command of the frigate USS President in 1809 and began patrolling off the Atlantic coast in September of that year. Bainbridge was transferred to shore duty in June, 1810.

=== War of 1812 ===
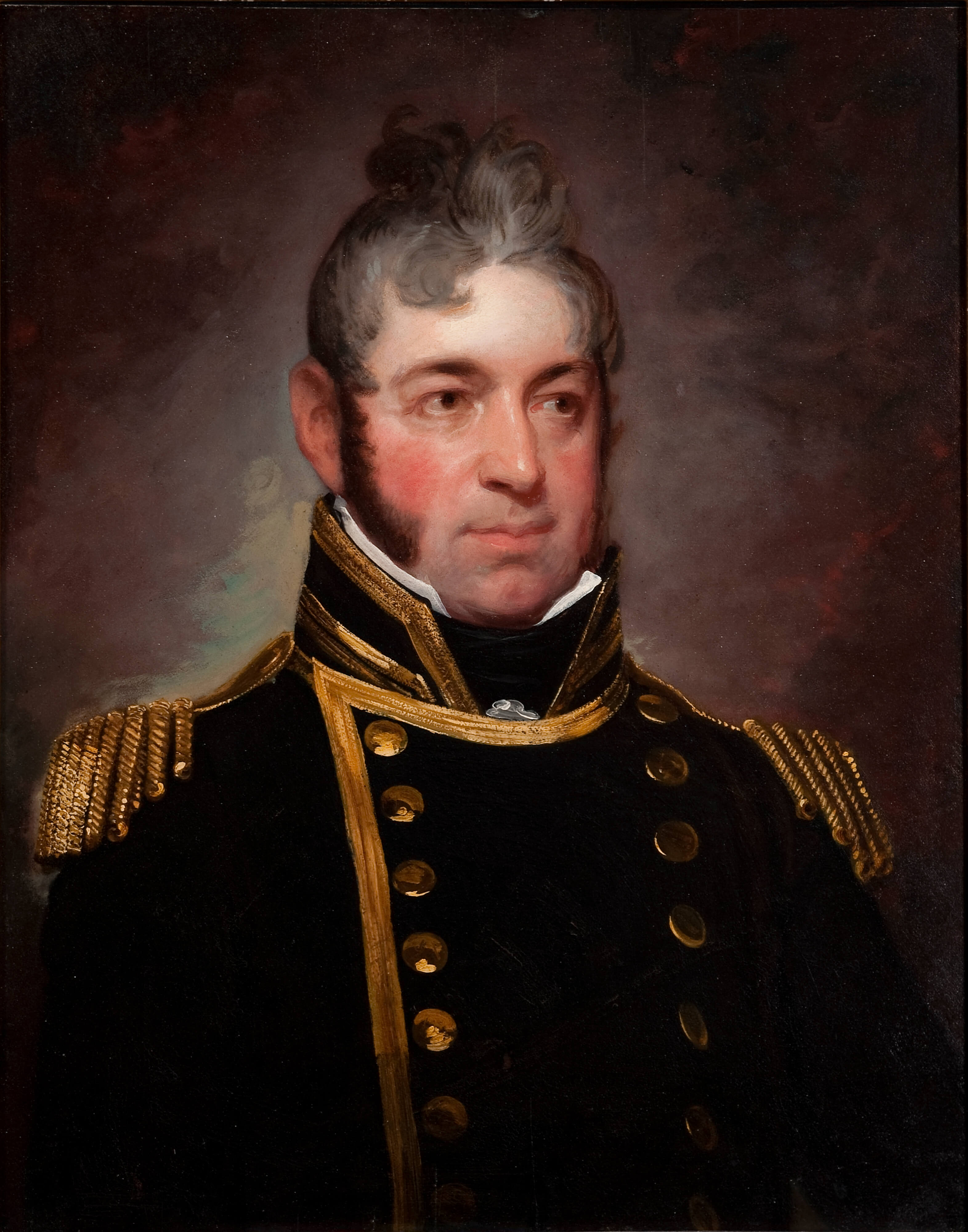
Portrait by Gilbert Stuart, c. 1813

On 15 September, shortly after the War of 1812 broke out between the United Kingdom and the United States, Bainbridge was appointed to command the 44-gun frigate USS Constitution, succeeding Captain Isaac Hull. Constitution was an enormous frigate of 1,533 tons, armed with 24-pounders, which had already captured the 38-gun frigate HMS Guerriere of 1,072 tons. Under Bainbridge, she was sent to cruise in the South Atlantic.

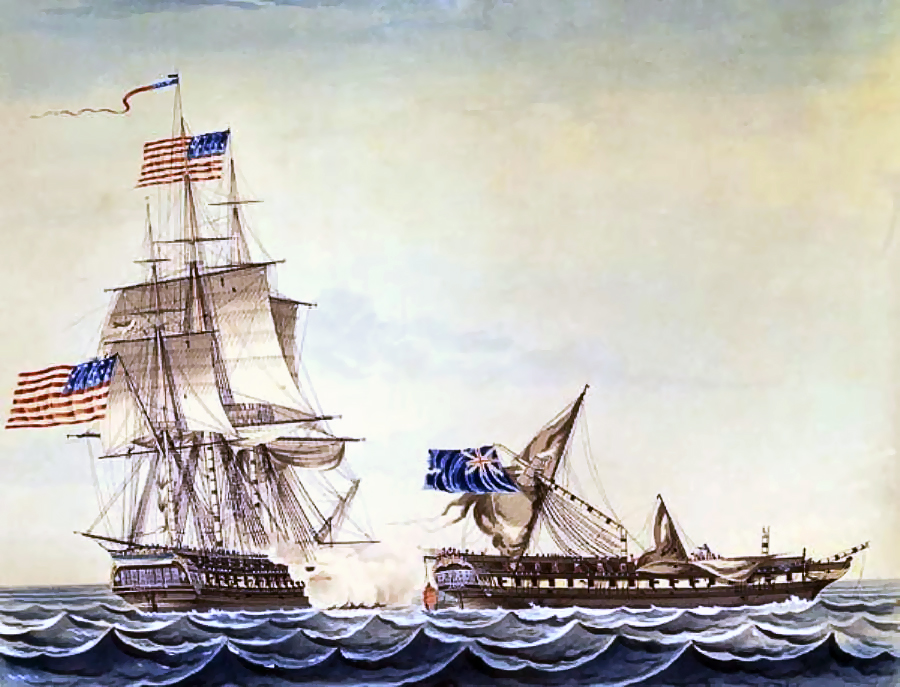
USS Constitution engaging HMS Java

On 29 December 1812, Bainbridge fell in with the 38-gun HMS Java, off the coast of Brazil. Java, of 1,083 tons, formerly the French frigate Renommée, was armed with 18-pounders and 32-pounder carronades. She had a crew of 300 men under Captain Henry Lambert and was on her way to the East Indies, carrying the newly appointed Lieutenant-General Hislop of Bombay and his staff along with dispatches to St. Helena, Cape of Good Hope and every British port in the Indian and China Seas. She had an inexperienced crew with only a very few trained seamen, and her men had only had one day's gunnery drill. In addition to her crew, Java was carrying officers and seamen who were to join the British fleet in the East Indies bringing her complement to around 400, among them Captain John Marshall who was to take command of a sloop of war stationed there. Under Bainbridge, Constitution had a well-drilled crew. Java was cut to pieces, with its rigging almost completely destroyed, and was forced to surrender, while having inflicted moderate damage to Constitution, including removing Constitution's helm with shot and hitting the lower masts (which did not fall because of their large diameter). During the action, Bainbridge was wounded twice, but maintained command throughout. Java fought extremely well as compared to the Guerriere and Macedonian which had been taken earlier that year by similarly overwhelming force. Java successfully outmaneuvered the large Constitution until her jib was shot away. If Constitution had been built with smaller diameter masts, she would have been dismasted. Fortunately, Constitution's masts were so wide that the smaller 18 lb shot from Java could not penetrate them. After three hours of intense fighting, Constitution prevailed. Because of the heavy damage inflicted on Java and the great distance from the American coast, Bainbridge decided to burn his prize. On March 3, 1813, President Madison presented Bainbridge with the Congressional Gold Medal for his service aboard Constitution.

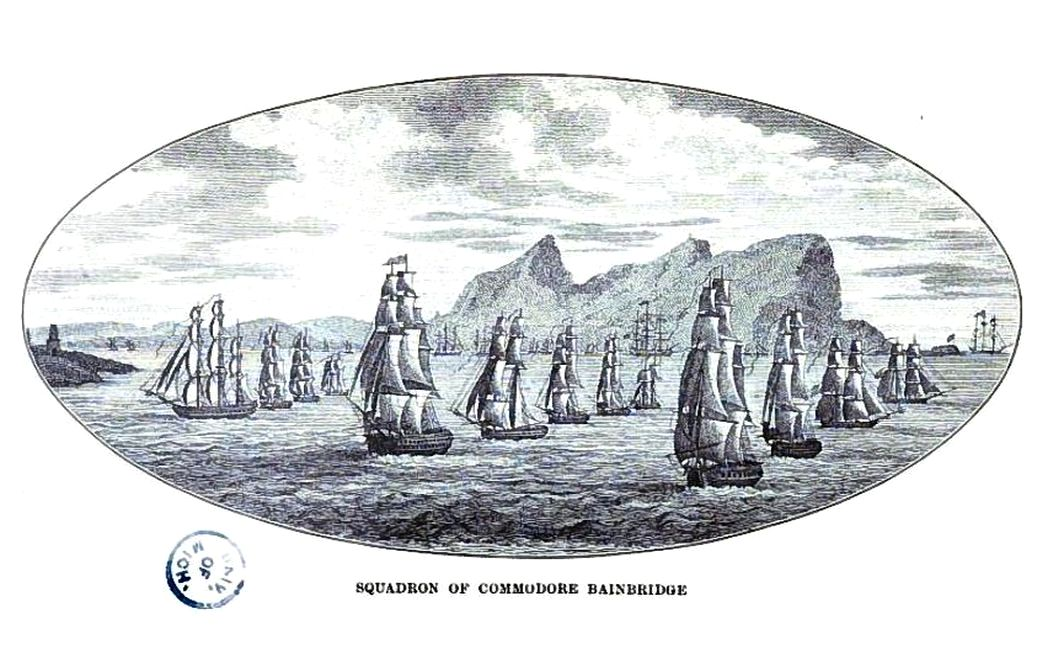
Bainbridge Squadron off Algiers

=== Second Barbary War ===
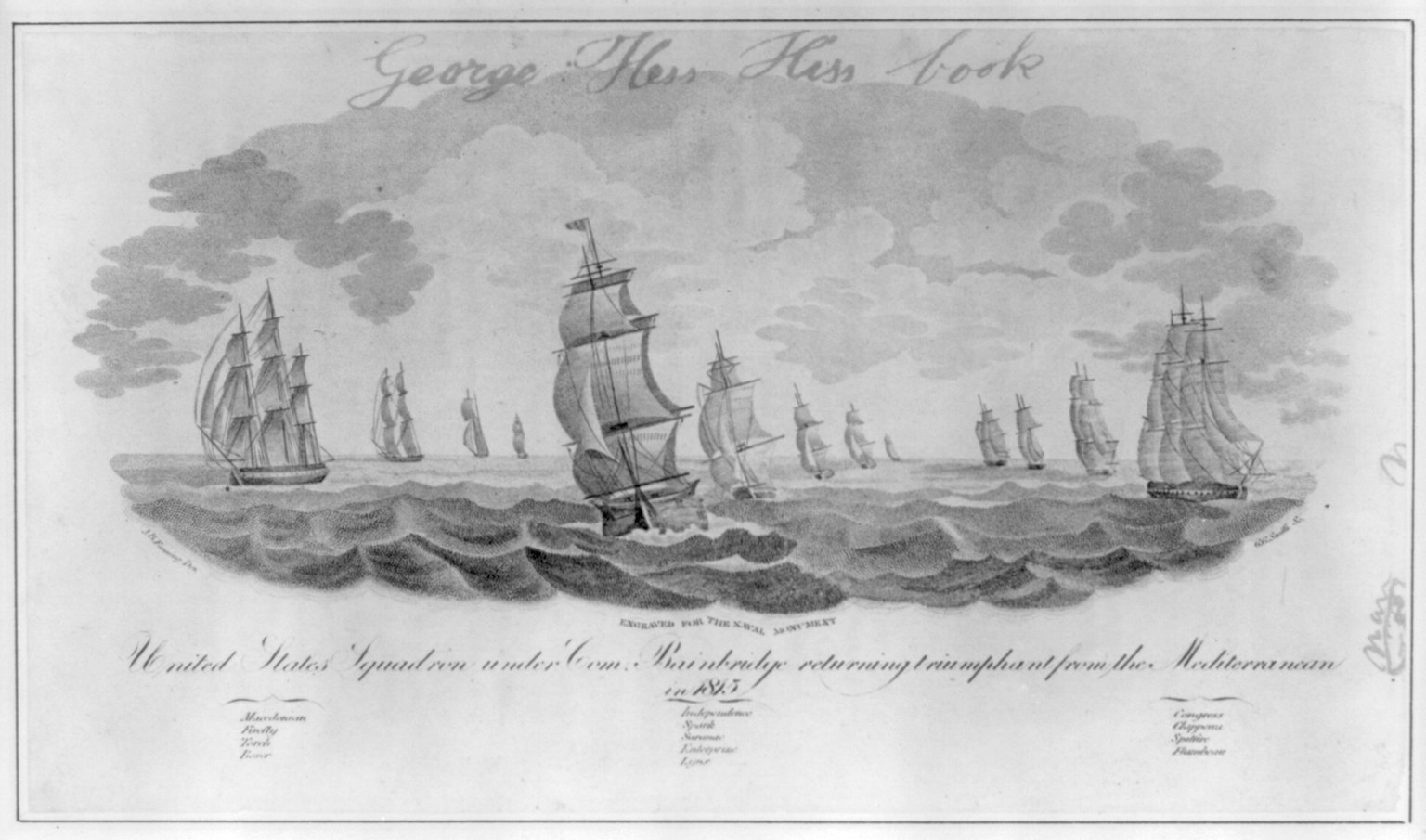
The United States Mediterranean Squadron of 1815

After the conclusion of the war with Britain, the United States engaged in the Second Barbary War of 1815 (also known as the Algerian War). It was the second of two wars fought between the United States and the Ottoman Empire's North African regencies of Tripoli, Tunis, and Algeria known collectively as the Barbary states. On March 3, 1815, the US Congress authorized deployment of naval power against the Regency of Algiers, and two squadrons were assembled and readied for war. Bainbridge served against the Barbary pirates and was commander of the US squadron sent to Algiers to enforce a blockade, show the extent of American naval resources and determination and enforce the neutrality and peace that was established by Stephen Decatur and William Shaler. The war ended in 1815 with the victory of the United States.

=== USS Columbus ===
Bainbridge transported Canova's George Washington from Italy to Boston aboard his flagship USS Columbus. The statue was delivered to Boston, transported to Raleigh, North Carolina, and then installed in the rotunda of the North Carolina State House on December 24, 1821.

== Later life ==
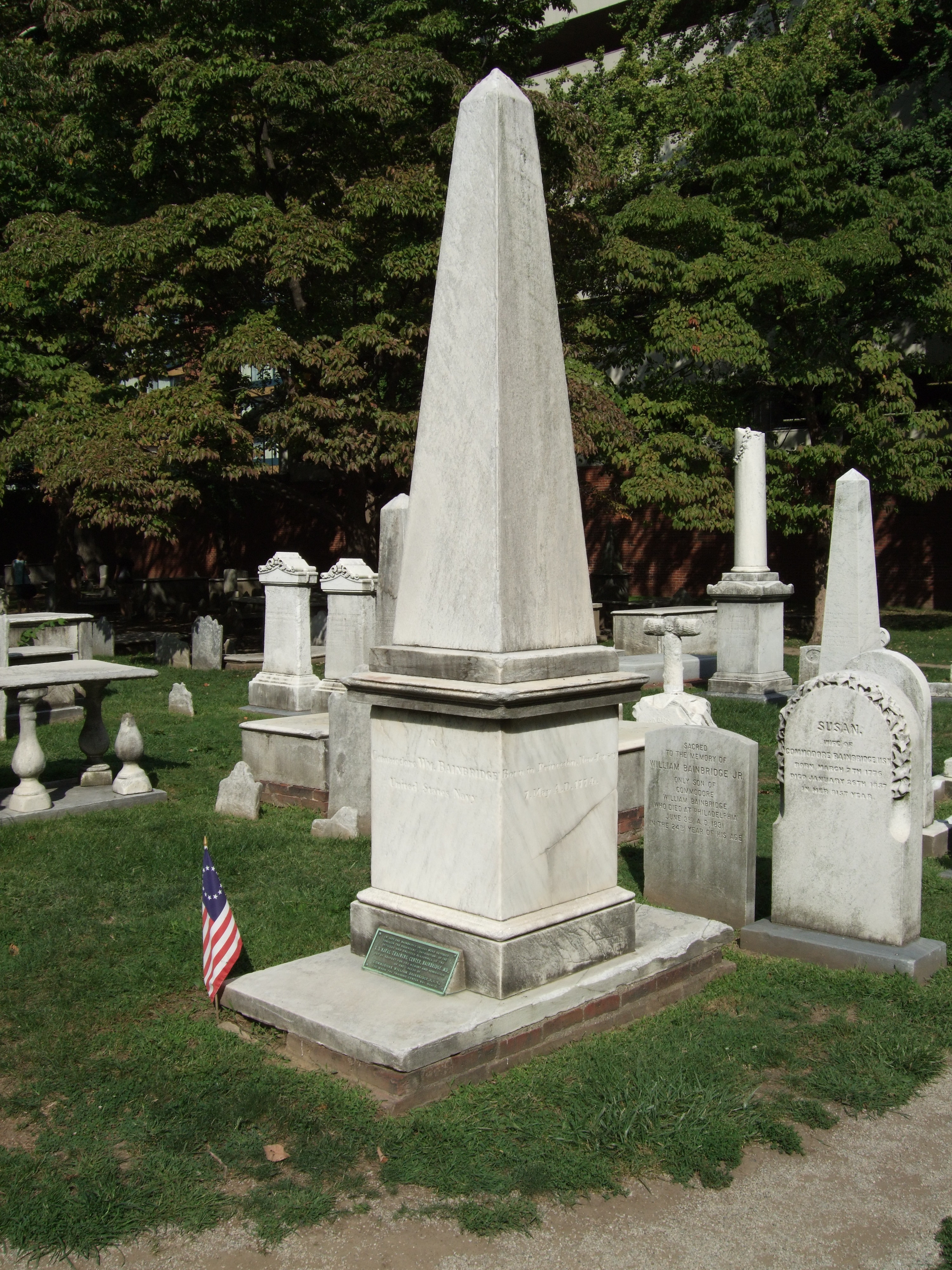
Bainbridge's tombstone at the Christ Church Burial Ground in Philadelphia

In 1820, Bainbridge served as second for Stephen Decatur in a duel with James Barron that cost Decatur his life. Decatur's wife, along with many historians, believe that Bainbridge had actually harbored a long-standing resentment of the younger but more famous Decatur and arranged the duel in a way that made the wounding or killing of one or more duelists very likely.

Between 1824 and 1827, he served on the Board of Navy Commissioners. He died in Philadelphia in July 1833 and was buried there at the Christ Church Burial Ground.

== Legacy ==
Bainbridge was survived by his son William Jr. and four daughters (Mary Taylor Bainbridge Jaudon, Susan Parker Hayes, Louisa Alexina Bainbridge and Lucy Ann Bainbridge). He left some money that was invested in Pennsylvania state bonds, which were sold and invested in other projects. After the American Civil War, Mary T. Jaudon's bonds were mismanaged by her husband's brother, Samuel Jaudon and ultimately became the subject of a United States Supreme Court case, Jaudon v. Duncan.

Several ships of the Navy have since been named USS Bainbridge in his honor, including the U.S. Navy's first destroyer (USS Bainbridge (DD-1)), a unique nuclear-powered destroyer/cruiser (USS Bainbridge (CGN-25)), and a contemporary Arleigh Burke-class destroyer USS Bainbridge (DDG-96). This last ship is known as the ship that rescued the MV Maersk Alabama in the 2009 attempted hijacking by Somali pirates. The now-deactivated United States Naval Training Center Bainbridge in Port Deposit, Cecil County, Maryland, was named for him.

Other places named after him include Bainbridge Island, Washington, as well as Bainbridge Township, Ohio; Bainbridge, Georgia, county seat of Decatur County; Bainbridge, Indiana; Bainbridge, New York; Bainbridge Street in Philadelphia; Bainbridge Street in Richmond, Virginia, and Old Bainbridge Road in Tallahassee, Florida. Bainbridge Avenue in the Bronx, New York, is also named for William Bainbridge, it runs near Decatur Avenue, named for Stephen Decatur, Jr. in the Norwood section of the Bronx. Bainbridge Street in Montgomery, Alabama, on which street the state capitol building is located, is also named for Bainbridge. Parallel to that Bainbridge Street and beginning directly to its west are streets named for other Barbary War/War of 1812 naval heroes: Decatur Street, named for Stephen Decatur; Hull Street, named for Isaac Hull; McDonough Street, named for Thomas Macdonough; Lawrence Street, named for James Lawrence and Perry Street, named for Oliver Hazard Perry. Bainbridge was also the namesake for Fort Bainbridge, built during the Creek War near Tuskegee, Alabama.

== See also ==
- Bibliography of early American naval history
- Continental Navy
- Glossary of nautical terms (A-L)
- Glossary of nautical terms (M-Z)
- List of ships captured in the 19th century
- List of sea captains

== Bibliography ==
- Allen, Gardner Weld (1905). Our Navy and the Barbary Corsairs.
  Houghton Mifflin & Co., Boston, New York and Chicago. p. 354. OCLC 2618279. URL
- Barnes, James (1896). Naval actions of the War of 1812.
  Harper & Brothers, New York. p. 263. URL
- —— (1897). Commodore Bainbridge:from the gunroom to the quarter-deck.
  D. Appleton and company. p. 168. ISBN 0945726589. URL1 URL2
- Cooper, James Fenimore (1846). Lives of distinguished American naval officers.
  Carey and Hart, Philadelphia. p. 436. OCLC 620356. URL
- —— (1853). Old Ironsides. G.P. Putnam, 1853. p. 49. URL
- Dearborn, H. A. S. (2011). The Life of William Bainbridge, Esq of the United States Navy.
  Kessinger Publishing. p. 252. URL
- Dept U.S.Navy. "Ships Histories Dictionary of American Naval Fighting Ships".
  Dictionary of American Naval Fighting Ships.
  DEPARTMENT OF THE NAVY -- NAVAL HISTORICAL CENTER. Archived from the original on August 19, 2000.
- Harris, Thomas (1837). The life and services of Commodore William Bainbridge, United States navy.
  Carey Lea & Blanchard, Philadelphia. p. 254. ISBN 0945726589. E'book1 E'book2
- Hickey, Donald R. (1989). The War of 1812, A Forgotten Conflict.
  University of Illinois Press, Chicago and Urbana. ISBN 0-252-01613-0. url-1, url-2
- Roosevelt, Theodore (1883). The naval war of 1812: ...
  G.P. Putnam's sons, New York. p. 541. E'book
- —— (1901). The naval operations of the war between Great Britain and the United States, 1812–1815.
  Little, Brown, and Company, Boston. p. 290. URL1 URL2 URL3
- Tucker, Spencer (2004). Stephen Decatur: a life most bold and daring.
  Naval Institute Press, 2004 Annapolis, Maryland. p. 245. ISBN 1-55750-999-9. URL
