= Bill Bainbridge =

English footballer

Personal information
- Full name: William Bainbridge
- Date of birth: 9 March 1922
- Place of birth: Gateshead, County Durham, England
- Date of death: 1966 (aged 44)
- Place of death: Chester, Cheshire, England
- Height: 1.78 m (5 ft 10 in)
- Position: Forward

Senior career*
Years	Team	Apps	(Gls)
1945–1946	Manchester United	0	(0)
1946–1948	Bury	2	(1)
1948–1954	Tranmere Rovers	168	(63)
1954–1956	Stafford Rangers		
1956–1957	Macclesfield Town	32	(21)
- * Club domestic league appearances and goals

William Bainbridge (9 March 1922 – 1966) was an English footballer who played as a forward for Manchester United, Bury and Tranmere Rovers in the Football League.

Born in Gateshead, County Durham, Bainbridge began his career with Ashington, but his career was immediately interrupted by the Second World War. During the war, Bainbridge played for Hartlepools United. His exploits there led to him signing for Manchester United when peace was declared, but, although he scored in a friendly match on his debut, he only made one appearance for the club and signed for Bury in May 1946, losing his place in the United team to Johnny Carey. He spent just over two seasons with Bury and moved to Tranmere Rovers in November 1948 after just two appearances for the Shakers.

It was at Tranmere that Bainbridge made the biggest impact. In six seasons with the Wirral side, Bainbridge played in almost 170 league matches, scoring 63 goals in the process. He died in Chester in 1966 at the age of 44.
