= Helen Fisher =

Helen Fisher may refer to:

- Helen Fisher (anthropologist) (1945–2024), Canadian-American anthropologist and human behavior researcher
- Helen Fisher (composer) (born 1942), New Zealand composer
- Helen Fisher, keyboardist and backing vocalist with New Adventures
- Helen Fisher Frye (1918–2014), American educator and churchwoman

== See also ==
- Ellen Fisher (disambiguation)
- Helene Fischer, Russian-German schlager singer
