= Helen Frye =

Helen Frye or Fry may refer to:

- Helen Fisher Frye (1918–2014), American educator and civil rights activist
- Helen J. Frye (1930–2011), American judge
- Helen Frye (writer), British writer and poet, see 1970 in literature
- Helen Varner Vanderbilt Frye (1908–1979), American and former wife to Cornelius Vanderbilt IV and Jack Frye
- Helen Kemp Frye (1910–1986) Canadian educator, editor and artist, first wife of Northrop Frye
- Helen Fry (born 1967), historian
- Helen Fry, a song on The Felice Brothers (album)
