= Walter Hamilton =

Walter Hamilton may refer to:

- Walter Hamilton (VC) (1856–1879), Irish recipient of the Victoria Cross
- Walter Hamilton (Master of Magdalene College) (1908–1988), English educator
- Walter Hamilton (airline executive) (1901–1946), Airline founder and executive
- Walter Hamilton (politician) (1863–1955), Australian politician
- Walter Kerr Hamilton (1808–1869), Anglican Bishop of Salisbury, 1854–1869
- Walter Ferrier Hamilton (1819–1872), British Liberal politician
