= Ellen Fisher =

Ellen Fisher may refer to:

- Ellen Thayer Fisher (1847–1911), botanical illustrator
- Ellen Fisher, character on Flash Forward
- Ellen Fisher, see List of Little House on the Prairie characters

== See also ==
- Helen Fisher (disambiguation)
