= Standard Air Lines =

Standard Air Lines was an airline founded by Jack Frye, Paul E. Richter and Walter A. Hamilton in 1927 (98 years ago). The three had founded Aero Corporation of California in 1926 in Los Angeles and Standard was made a subsidiary of Aero in 1927.

== History ==
Standard Air Lines was a transport agent for U.S. Air Mail and also flew passengers to destinations throughout the Southwest United States, including Los Angeles, Phoenix, Tucson, Douglas, Arizona, and El Paso.

On November 28, 1927, Standard Air Lines began operations as Arizona's first inter and intrastate scheduled air carrier. In 1929, it started a rail link at El Paso, Texas, to carry passengers farther east by train. This was the first regular transcontinental rail and air passenger line to and from California.

Standard Air Lines began business as a three-times a week passenger and express service between Los Angeles, Phoenix and Tucson. The initial fleet consisted of two Fokker airplanes (NC7713 and NC8011) and seven OX5-powered Eaglerock airplanes. Standard carried 61 passengers during its first month of operations in December 1927.

Initially, aircraft left Los Angeles on Monday, Wednesday and Friday at 10:00 AM Pacific Time (PT), arrived in Phoenix at 3:30 PM Mountain Time (MT), and at Tucson at 5:00 PM MT. For the return trip, aircraft left Tucson at 8:00 AM MT on Tuesday, Thursday and Saturday, arriving at Phoenix at 9:25 AM MT and Los Angeles at 1:30 PM PT.

Passenger fares were, for Los Angeles to Phoenix $47.50; Los Angeles to Tucson $60.00; Phoenix to Tucson $12.50. Express rates per pound were, for Los Angeles to Phoenix $1.30; Los Angeles to Tucson $1.60; Phoenix to Tucson $.50.

Late in its life, Standard Air Lines extended its range to other cities. Its western terminus was Los Angeles, and it ultimately served Phoenix, Tucson, and Douglas, AZ, with El Paso, TX as its eastern terminus.

On August 4, 1929, eight months before its ultimate sale, Standard Air Lines became the western link in an air-rail transcontinental schedule. Passengers traveled from New York to St. Louis by rail, connected with a Southwest Air Fast Express Ford Trimotor to Sweetwater, TX, then took an overnight train, "The Texan," to El Paso. In El Paso, passengers connected with Standard Air Lines for Los Angeles. Under ideal conditions, the coast-to-coast voyage took 43 hours and 40 minutes, a savings of about 16 hours over the all-train routing.

== Advertisements ==
The airline was described in advertising brochures as "The Fair Weather Route," with the pleasant desert terrain beneath used as a marketing point. Advertised flight duration from Los Angeles to El Paso was 8 hours and 45 minutes.

== Acquisitions ==
Standard Air Lines remained in business for about 30 months. Frye, as well as being the founder of the company, was also an active pilot of the line. Because of the Great Depression, Frye and his associates sold the airline to Western Air Express in March 1930. Concomitant with the sale, Frye joined Western Air Express on the Board of Directors and as Chief of Operations.

Later in 1930, Western Air Express merged with Transcontinental Air Transport in 1930 to form T&WA (TWA). Frye became president of T&WA in 1934 and Richter became Vice President. TWA was known as "The Airline Run by Flyers."

== See also ==
- List of defunct airlines of the United States
