= Paul E. Richter =

American aviator (1896–1949)

Paul Ernest Richter Jr.
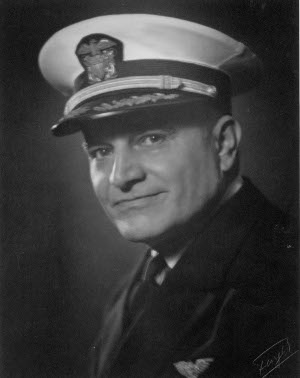
- Captain Paul E. Richter, US Navy WWII
- Born: January 20, 1896; Denver, Colorado, U.S
- Died: May 15, 1949 (aged 53); Berkeley, California, U.S
- Occupation(s): Airline co-founder and executive
- Military career
- Allegiance: United States of America
- Branch: US Navy
- Rank: Captain
- Battles / wars: World War II
- Awards: Legion of Merit; Wall of Honor, Smithsonian Air and Space Museum
- Spouse(s): Daisy Cooke Richter
- Children: 2

Paul Ernest Richter Jr. (January 20, 1896 – May 15, 1949) was an American aviation pioneer, co-founder of Standard Air Lines and executive vice president of Trans World Airlines (TWA), operations chief of staff of the Naval Air Transport Service during World War II and chairman of the board, president of TACA Airlines from 1947 to 1949.

== Early life ==
Richter was born on January 20, 1896, to cattle ranchers Paul and Margaret Richter in Denver, Colorado. While growing up, Richter worked on the family ranch in Wiggins, Colorado, as a "cub" reporter for the Denver Post, and at his father's advertising agency. He attended Colorado State College of Agriculture and Mechanical Arts for one year.

== Airline career ==
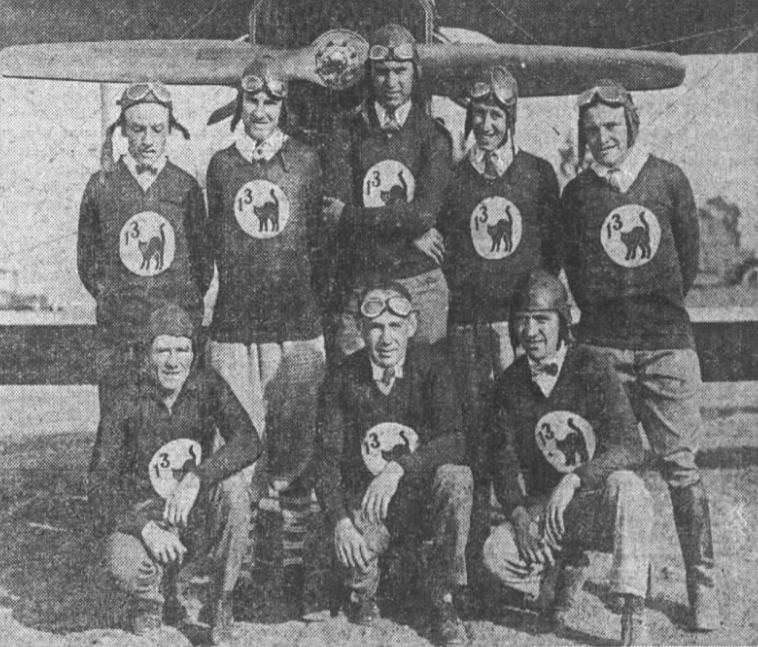
13 Black Cats, circa 1925. Richter is standing in the back row, at far right.

Richter learned to fly at Burdett Field in Los Angeles, under to tutelage of Burdett Fuller. Richter received his pilot's license #309 in 1924, Air Transport license #501 in 1927 and Aircraft and Engine Mechanic license #702 in 1927. Richter became good friends with one of Fuller's flight instructors, Jack Frye, and another student pilot, Walter Hamilton. Richter and Frye had much in common: they both grew up on a cattle ranch and moved to California to pursue aviation careers. In 1925, Richter and Frye earned positions with Hollywood's famous "13 Black Cats", an aviation stunt team for the movie industry.

In 1926, Richter, Frye and Hamilton, pooled their money together and founded Aero Corporation of California. Aero Corp bought Fuller's business and provided charter services, aerial surveying, sightseeing, flight instruction, and crop dusting. Hamilton, who had been a mechanic for the Duesenberg Motors Company, ran their aircraft maintenance operation. Richter competed as an award-winning air race pilot with the Aero Corp airplanes.

Richter, Frye and Hamilton founded Standard Airlines in 1927 as a subsidiary of Aero Corp and started scheduled passenger service between Los Angeles, Phoenix, and Tucson. Within a year they added El Paso, Texas, to the route. In 1929, Richter and Frye set a commercial aircraft altitude record of 22,680 feet (6,910 m) in one of Standard's Fokker F-10 tri-motor aircraft.

In March 1930, Western Air Express bought controlling interest in Aero Corp, but continued to operate Standard Airlines as a separate airline. Western Air Express made Richter, Frye, and Hamilton vice presidents of the Standard Division. In July 1930, Postmaster General Walter Folger Brown forced the merger between Transcontinental Air Transport (TAT) and Western Air Express, to create Transcontinental and Western Air (T&WA). However, Standard Airlines would go to American Airlines as part of the deal due to its southern route into Texas. Richter, Frye, and Hamilton elected to stay with T&WA. Richter was made vice president of the Western Division, Frye was made vice president of operations, and Hamilton made maintenance superintendent. T&WA changed its name to TWA, and due to this trio was known as "The Airline Run by Flyers."

In 1934 Richter was made vice president of operations and director, and Frye was made president and director. Richter became executive vice president in 1938. In 1937, Richter and Frye founded "Conquistadores del Cielo" (Conquerors of the Sky), an annual gathering of top airline executives at a dude ranch in Wyoming.

After Frye resigned from TWA due to a dispute with owner Howard Hughes in 1947, Richter was offered the position of president but decided to resign as well.

From 1947 to 1949, Richter served as chairman and president of TACA Airlines of Central and South America.

== Military career ==
Richter enlisted as a private in the army in 1918, but World War I ended while he was still in training. After the war, he was accepted into Field Artillery Officer Training and graduated in 1919, as a second lieutenant. Richter remained in the Army Reserves until 1934.

In 1942, Richter reported for duty with the United States Navy and was made lieutenant commander and assistant chief of staff of operations, Naval Air Transport Service. In 1944, Richter was promoted to captain and made chief of staff of the Naval Air Transport Service. Richter was released from active duty in 1945, and returned to work at TWA. In 1946, Richter received the Legion of Merit for his work with the Naval Air Transport Service.

Richter returned briefly to active duty in 1948 to help consolidate the Naval Air Transport Service with the Air Transport Command, creating the Military Air Transport Service.

== Death and honors ==
Richter died on May 15, 1949, at his home in Berkeley, California, from a cerebral hemorrhage shortly after he took a position with the Coca Cola Company.

Richter is on the Wall of Honor at the Smithsonian Air and Space Museum. The University of Central Missouri has the "Paul E. Richter TWA" scholarship for aviation students.
