= Western Air Lines Flight 636 =

1953 aviation accident in California

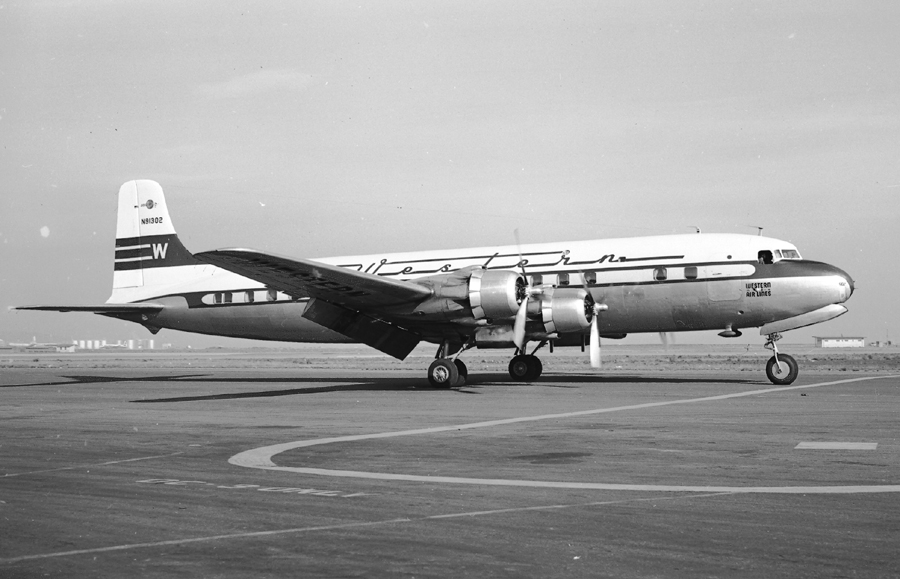
- A Western Air Lines DC-6B, similar to the accident aircraft

Accident
- Date: April 20, 1953
- Summary: Controlled flight into terrain
- Site: San Francisco Bay, California; 37.665°N 122.305°W

Aircraft
- Aircraft type: Douglas DC-6B
- Operator: Western Air Lines
- Registration: N91303
- Flight origin: Los Angeles International Airport, Los Angeles
- Stopover: San Francisco International Airport, San Francisco
- Destination: Oakland Municipal Airport, Oakland, California
- Occupants: 10
- Passengers: 5
- Crew: 5
- Fatalities: 8
- Survivors: 2

Western Air Lines Flight 636 was a scheduled flight between Los Angeles International Airport and Oakland Municipal Airport in Oakland, California. Late in the evening of April 20, 1953, the Douglas DC-6B aircraft serving the flight crashed into the San Francisco Bay while making the short flight from a stopover at San Francisco International Airport to Oakland, killing eight of the ten occupants of the plane. Most of the aircraft and two of the victims were never recovered from the bay.

An investigation led by the Civil Aeronautics Board (CAB) concluded that the pilot had made errors during the flight while trying to remain below the low clouds in the area. The errors resulted in the aircraft descending below the minimum safe altitude and eventually hitting the water. The flight crew may have experienced sensory illusions while flying in the darkness with only the distant lights of the airport ahead to use as a visual reference. This may have led the pilot to believe the aircraft was flying higher than it actually was.

== Background ==
Flight 636 was Western Air Lines's regularly scheduled flight between Los Angeles International Airport in Los Angeles and Oakland Municipal Airport in Oakland, California, with an intermediate stop at San Francisco International Airport in San Francisco. It was operated using the company's flagship 66-passenger Douglas DC-6B aircraft.

On April 20, 1953, the flight departed Los Angeles at 9:00 p.m. Pacific Standard Time with 35 passengers. (Note: News reports at the time reported that 49 passengers boarded the plane in Los Angeles, but the official accident report gives the number as 35.) It landed in San Francisco at 10:40 p.m., and most of the passengers got off the plane. Five of them stayed on the aircraft for the final six-minute flight to Oakland, and no additional passengers boarded. Ground crews did not need to perform any maintenance in San Francisco, and the plane took off at 11:05 for the eleven-mile (18 km) flight with 1,700 US gallons (6,400 L) of fuel and five crew members.

The weather was overcast at the time, with reported cloud ceilings at 800 feet (240 m) and visibility of ten miles (16 km). The flight was cleared to Oakland under a special clearance called the "Visual Trans-Bay". This clearance had been available since April 1952 for traffic between San Francisco and Oakland and was used when cloud ceilings were below 1,000 feet (300 m) or when visibility was low. It called for aircraft to fly using visual flight rules below the clouds, but no higher than 1,000 feet (300 m), and no lower than 500 feet (150 m). In the event that flights were unable to remain below the clouds before hitting the 500-foot minimum, the procedure called for the aircraft to climb to 2,000 feet (610 m) and circle at a point northwest of the Oakland airport to receive further instructions from air traffic control.

== Accident ==
After taking off from San Francisco, the aircraft turned to the right toward Oakland Municipal Airport. As it completed the turn and flew over the San Francisco Bay, it was picked up on a primary surveillance radar system in operation at Oakland. The radar operator continued to monitor the flight until it was within the range of the short-range six-mile (ten-kilometer) radar, and then it was followed using that system. The aircraft was flying at 600 feet (180 m) while remaining below the clouds. At 11:07, the crew of Flight 636 contacted the tower controller at Oakland and advised that the flight was flying the Trans-Bay procedure, and requested clearance to the airport. The flight was cleared to enter the traffic pattern to enter the Hayward instrument approach to Oakland Airport.

At 11:08, the aircraft struck the water of the San Francisco Bay four miles (six kilometers) northeast of the San Francisco Airport and six miles (ten kilometers) southwest of the Oakland Airport. The aircraft broke apart and was destroyed in the crash. Controllers at both airports noticed a bright orange flash that came from the direction of Flight 636. At the same time, the target vanished from the radar screen in Oakland, and the radar operator expressed surprise that he had lost contact with the flight.

The crash was the first involving Western Airlines since December 1946, when Western Air Lines Flight 44 crashed into the Laguna Mountains near San Diego. It was the first loss of a DC-6 aircraft by the airline since they had been put into operation that January.

== Aftermath ==
After seeing the flash of light and the loss of the radar signal, the radar operator at Oakland made a note of the distance and bearing of the last position of the aircraft and called the Alameda Naval Air Station and the San Francisco Coast Guard Station to let them know that a plane had gone down in the bay. The Coast Guard sent two helicopters and three fixed-wing aircraft to the area, guided by the radar operators. The Alameda Naval Air Station sent out two crash rescue boats, and two Navy tugboats were sent out from Hunters Point Naval Shipyard. When the Coast Guard aircraft arrived in the area, the crew found debris on the surface of the water and started dropping flares to light up the area.

The water was littered with small pieces of wreckage, seat cushions, other debris, as well as a large oil slick that had burned for a short time after the crash. One of the crash boats, guided by the flares, was able to find three survivors in the water, and pulled them onto the boat. One of the three collapsed and died as he was being loaded aboard the boat. He had been in the water holding on to a piece of aircraft debris along with one of the plane's flight attendants, but she was not found. The survivors had been in the cold water for about an hour, holding on to foam rubber seat cushions to stay afloat. They were confused and in shock, but aside from some minor bruising, they were not injured. They were taken to the Oak Knoll Naval Hospital to rest and recover and remained there until the following afternoon.

Within a few hours of the crash, the bodies of four of the victims had been retrieved from the water. Helicopters and rescue boats continued to search for survivors for hours after the crash, but finally had to give up. Tidal forces were causing the water currents in the bay to flow out to the Pacific Ocean, and by the middle of the next day there was no debris or remnants of an oil slick to indicate the location of the accident. Two more victims were eventually found in different parts of the bay in the weeks after the crash. The bodies of the pilot and the flight engineer were never found and were believed to be trapped inside the aircraft.

Newspapers reported that one of the survivors said that he thought that one of the engines had been giving the crew problems during the flight, because he kept seeing them turn on lights that lit up the left outboard engine, but the next day he said that he had been misquoted and had never noticed any problem with the engine. He said that the right wing of the plane hit the water first, and then there was a bright flash.

The Civil Aeronautics Board (CAB) was notified of the accident a few minutes after the crash. James Peyton, chief investigator from the CAB's Washington, D.C. office, headed the investigation. He was already in the area conducting investigations of the March 20 crash of Transocean Air Lines Flight 942 the March 26 ditching of a California Eastern Airways DC-4 in the bay.

== Aircraft ==
The aircraft was a Douglas DC-6B radial engine aircraft, serial number 43823/298, registered as tail number N91303. It had been manufactured by Douglas Aircraft Company in 1952 and had been flown for a total of 826 hours at the time of the crash. It was powered by four Pratt & Whitney R-2800 Double Wasp CB16 engines and Hamilton Standard propellers.

Western Air Lines had placed its first order of five DC-6 aircraft in 1951, with a targeted delivery date of late 1952. Designed with a capacity of 66 passengers, the airline's DC-6 fleet was placed in service on its west coast routes between Los Angeles, San Francisco, Portland, and Seattle in early 1953. The planes had been purchased at a cost of $1.2 million (equivalent to $15,000,000 in 2025) each.

== Passengers and crew ==
The flight carried five passengers and five crew members, all residents of the United States. One crew member and one passenger survived the crash. The bodies of two of the victims were never recovered from the bay.

The captain of the flight, Robert E. Clark, was a 35-year-old resident of Torrance, California. He had been employed by Western Air Lines since April 1940, and had a total logged flying time of 11,500 hours. His total experience flying the DC-6B was 79 hours, of which less than three hours was flying in instrument meteorological conditions. He had recently been transferred to the Los Angeles to San Francisco route and had flown the trans-bay flight between San Francisco and Oakland a total of twelve times. Prior to his transfer, he had flown Douglas DC-4 and Convair CV-240 aircraft. The first officer of the flight, 31-year-old Robert C. Jacobsen, was a resident of Whittier, California. He had flown for Western Air Lines since September 1946, and had total logged flight experience of 3,100 hours, of which about 38 had been on the DC-6B. The flight engineer was Robert League, 35, of Los Angeles.

== Investigation ==
The day after the crash, Coast Guard boats started their search for the main wreckage of the aircraft in the bay between San Francisco and Oakland. Investigators said they hoped to recover the plane to recover the engines, propellers, instruments, and the main part of the aircraft structure. The CAB requested and received the assistance of a submarine chaser to start conducting sonar surveys over a six-square-mile (sixteen-square-kilometer) section of the bay, which revealed two locations with large objects on the bottom, suggesting that the plane had broken in half. The searchers used grappling hooks to try to pull up parts from the locations and were able to retrieve a pillow that had the Western Air Lines logo on it at one of the locations, confirming that they had found the correct location. Ultimately, very little of the plane was ever recovered, which made a complete mechanical inspection impossible to complete. With the wreckage buried in the soft, deep, mud at the bottom of the bay, investigators were not able to recover any of the engines, and only recovered one of the propellers. That propeller was so badly damaged that it was impossible to determine the conditions under which it was operating at the time of the crash. The largest portion that was recovered was the wing center section that still had the two main landing gears attached to it. Inspection of that section showed that the landing gear was fully retracted at the time of the crash.

The CAB held a two-day public meeting at the Alameda Hotel in Alameda, California, beginning on May 21, 1953. A five-member board of CAB officials conducted the meeting, where they received testimony from witnesses, survivors, airline officials, and investigators.

During the hearings, one of the survivors, a flight attendant, testified that as the aircraft left Los Angeles, she heard a sound that seemed to her like a cable striking the outer cabin door. She reported the noise to the captain. In San Francisco, the flight engineer and a mechanic from Western Air Lines performed a walk-around inspection of the aircraft, but they did not report finding any problems. The flight attendant described the first part of the flight to Oakland as normal, and about five minutes after taking off she heard the sounds of the airflow over the wings increase, which sounded like the pilot had increased the degree of flaps. She also heard the engines decrease power, which she considered a normal event in the course of landing. She was then surprised when she felt what seemed like the nose wheel striking the runway, because it seemed to be too soon to be landing. She felt an unusual buffeting, a hard jolt, then the lights went out in the plane. She said she was not even aware they had landed in the water until she saw a pillow float past her. She and the other flight attendant grabbed foam-rubber seat cushions as the water entered the plane and left the plane through a large hole that had been opened up in the ceiling of the cabin.

Another survivor, a male passenger, testified that the flight seemed normal, and that the plane was flying below the clouds the whole time. He saw the plane descend from what seemed like 500 feet (150 m) to about 20 feet (6 m) above the water. He felt the plane skid, then there was a blinding flash. He said that there were statements in the news reporting after the accident that he had said the plane may have been experiencing engine troubles, but at the hearings he said the engines were running smoothly, without coughing, backfiring, or any other indications of problems. He said the plane did not make any sudden turns or abnormal maneuvers before the crash, and that the wings were level when it hit the water.

A CAB investigator testified that there was not any evidence to suggest that there had been any fire or structural failure of the aircraft before the crash. However, most of the aircraft was never recovered from the San Francisco Bay, where it crashed in water about 30 feet (10 m) deep. The weather reports given to the crew before the flight indicated measured cloud ceilings of 800 feet (240 m) at San Francisco and 700 feet (210 m) at Oakland, and a few minutes after takeoff ceilings of 900 feet (270 m) at San Francisco and 800 feet (240 m) at Oakland. However, during the initial search for the crash site, Coast Guard helicopters reported that they encountered cloud bases of 400 to 500 feet (120 to 150 m) above the water in the area of the crash. Crews of other flights that were flying the Trans-Bay procedure in the hour before and after the crash reported cloud ceilings ranging from 400 to 1,000 feet (120 to 300 m). The hearings concluded without identifying any clear cause of the crash. The board members announced that they planned to study the result of the hearings and other investigations before releasing a final report.

== Final report ==
The CAB released a final report on December 1, 1953. In its report, the CAB found that the crew was qualified to fly the aircraft and that the evidence showed that the aircraft was in airworthy condition at the time of the crash. The report concluded that the probable cause of the crash was the pilot's decision to descend below the 500-foot (150 m) minimum altitude, causing the plane to strike the water. It also found that the sensory illusions experienced by the flight crew that led to them misjudging the aircraft's true altitude likely contributed to the accident.

The report outlined a probable sequence of events that led to the accident. It said that the flight probably encountered an area where the cloud level was lower than what had been reported in the pre-flight weather conditions, probably as low as 400 feet (120 m) as had been experienced by search and rescue aircraft after the crash. In order to stay below the cloud level, the pilot unknowingly descended below the 500-foot (150 m) minimum safe altitude. It was likely that in the darkness, it would have been extremely difficult, if not impossible, for the pilot to visually judge the aircraft's distance above the water.

When an aircraft flies in a straight line at a constant altitude, a decrease in its speed, such as when the pilot slows down to prepare to land, creates a need for its angle of attack to increase to maintain lift to remain at the same altitude. This change in the angle of attack and increase in pitch causes the nose of the aircraft to raise relative to the tail.

In the darkness, the lights of the airport five miles (eight kilometres) away were probably the only visual points of reference available to the pilots. The increased pitch of the aircraft would have made the distant lights appear in a lower part of the windshield when viewed by the pilots. This would have given them the perception that the aircraft was flying higher than it actually was if the pilots relied only on visual cues. In this scenario, the pilot allowed the aircraft to descend into the bay, in the belief that he was still safely above the water. The investigators could not answer the question of why the pilots did not monitor the two altimeters in the cockpit, or follow the missed approach procedure of climbing to 2,000 feet (600 m) when they were not able to maintain visual contact above 500 feet.

In the immediate aftermath of the crash, the Trans-Bay procedure was modified to maintain a minimum altitude of 1,500 feet (460 m) while the Civil Aeronautics Authority (CAA) reviewed the safety of the 500-foot minimums. The CAA and a joint industry group reviewed the procedure and concluded that the procedure in its original form ensured "a reasonable degree of safety consistent with normal standards." Nevertheless, the final CAB report expressed the opinion that the procedure needed special attention to ensure that safety standards were strictly followed in the future, and that further study was needed to determine if any additional measures could increase the margin of safety.
