= Walter Hamilton (airline executive) =

Walter A. Hamilton
- Born: June 9, 1901; Los Angeles, CA
- Died: March 28, 1946 (aged 44); Kansas City, MO
- Occupations: Co-founder of Standard Airlines; TWA Executive
- Known for: Airline pioneer
- Military career
- Allegiance: United States of America
- Branch: US Navy
- Service years: 1942-1944
- Rank: Captain
- Conflicts: World War II
- Spouses: Wilma Sutton; Harriet Fairchild
- Children: 2 step-children

Walter Andrew Hamilton (June 9, 1901 – March 28, 1946) was an American pioneer in the airline industry. Hamilton was a co-founder of Standard Air Lines and through a series of airline mergers became one of the "Three Musketeers" running Trans World Airlines.

== Early life ==
Hamilton was born to Wilbur and Martha (Stellmacher) Hamilton on June 9, 1901, in Los Angeles, California. He became a mechanic for the Duesenberg Motors Company.

== Aviation career ==
Hamilton learned to fly at Burdett Field in Los Angeles by instructor Burdett Fuller. Hamilton became good friends with two other pilots he met there, Jack Frye and Paul E. Richter. Hamilton, Frye, and Richter pooled their money together in 1925 and formed Aero Corporation of California (Aero Corp). Aero Corp bought Burdett Fuller's flight school and did everything from flight instruction, banner towing, crop dusting, charter flights, to supporting local high school aviation clubs. Hamilton ran the aircraft maintenance division of Aero Corp, while Frye and Richter focused on the flying. Hamilton's ability to tune aircraft engines allowed Frye and Richter to set multiple aircraft speed and altitude records, such as the 1926 Reginald Denny Trophy, 1927 Western Flying Trophy, and a 1926 18,000 ft altitude record. In preparation for extending their business into Arizona, the trio earned their Arizona State Commercial Pilot Certificates on the same day with Frye getting certificate #1, Hamilton #2, and Richter #3.

On February 3, 1926, Standard Air Lines was formed as a subsidiary of Aero Corp, but didn't start flight operations until November 28, 1927. Standard Air Lines ran scheduled passenger service from Los Angeles to Phoenix to Tucson and return. Within a year they extended the route to El Paso, Texas. Standard started with single engine Fokker F-7 aircraft, but soon upgraded to the Fokker F-10 tri-motor aircraft. As in Aero Corp, Hamilton ran the aircraft maintenance for Standard, while Frye and Richter focused on the flying.

In early 1930, Western Air Express bought controlling interest of Standard Air Lines, but continued to run it as a separate entity and made Hamilton, Frye, and Richter vice presidents of the Standard Division. In July 1930, Western Air Express merged with Transcontinental Air Transport to form Transcontinental and Western Air (T&WA). Because of Standard's southern route from Los Angeles to El Paso, the government forced the sale of Standard Air Lines to American Airlines as part of the deal. Hamilton, Frye, and Richter elected to stay with the newly formed T&WA. Transcontinental and Western Airlines eventually changed their name to Trans World Airlines (TWA) where Hamilton was Superintendent of Maintenance, Frye became president, and Richter Executive Vice President. The trio became known at TWA as the "Three Musketeers" and was the inspiration for the TWA slogan "The airline run by flyers."

In 1939, Hamilton left TWA for a position at the Douglas Aircraft Company.

== World War II ==
Hamilton was called to service in the US Navy in 1942. He worked in the Navy's Bureau of Aeronautics and was released from active duty in 1944 at the rank of captain. Hamilton returned to work for TWA after the war.

== Personal life ==
Hamilton married Wilma Sutton in Los Angeles on July 6, 1920. He later married Harriet Fairchild and became the step-father to Juanita and Warren.

== Death ==
Hamilton died of a kidney infection on March 28, 1946, at the Research Hospital in Kansas City. He is buried at Forest Lawn Memorial Park in Glendale, California.
