= Western Airlines =

Airline of the United States (1925–1987)

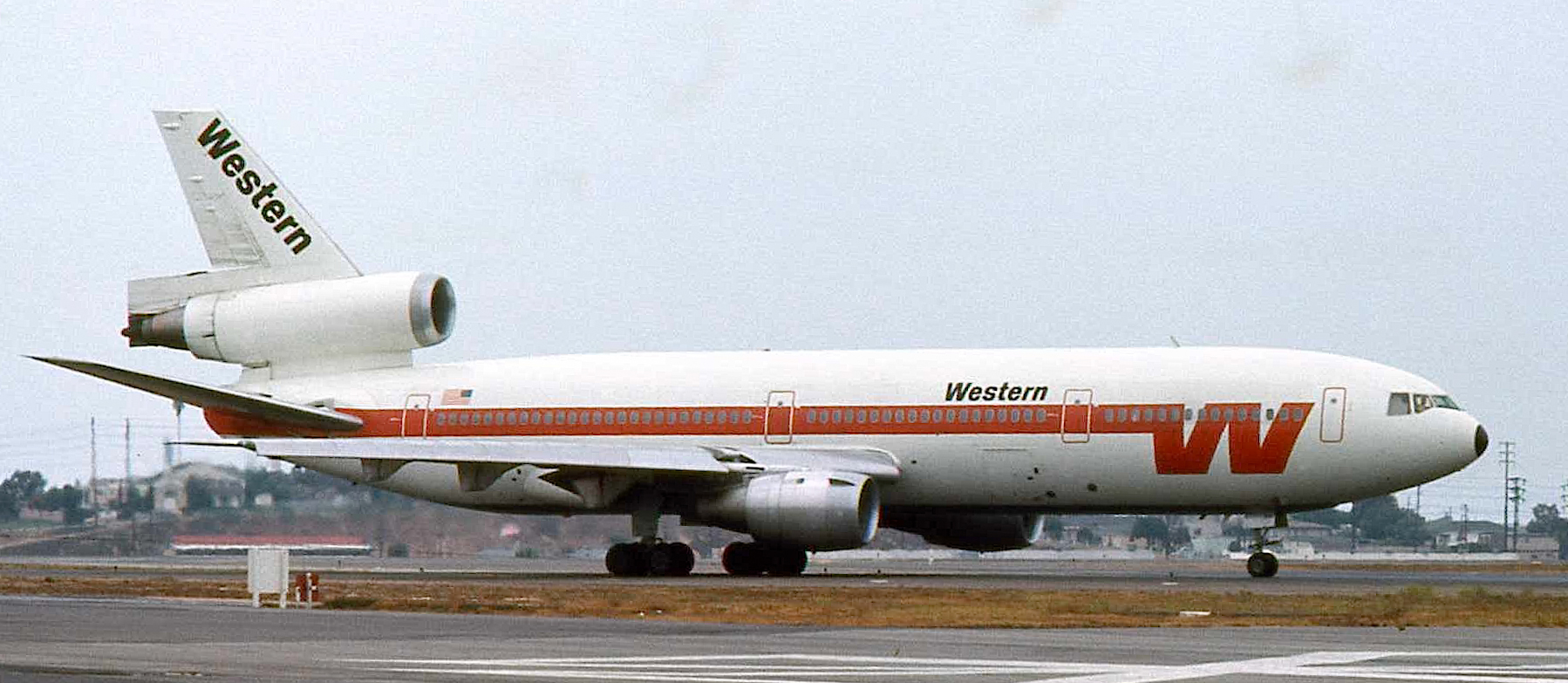
- McDonnell Douglas DC-10
IATA	ICAO	Call sign
WA	WAL	WESTERN
- Founded: July 1925 (as Western Air Express)
- Commenced operations: April 17, 1926 (as Western Air Express)
- Ceased operations: April 1, 1987 (merged into Delta Air Lines)
- Hubs: Denver–Stapleton; Los Angeles; Salt Lake City
- Frequent-flyer program: TravelPass II
- Headquarters: Los Angeles, California, United States
- Founder: Harris Hanshue

Western Airlines was a trunk carrier, a scheduled airline based in California, operating in the Western United States including Alaska and Hawaii, and western Canada, as well as to New York City, Boston, Washington, D.C., and Miami and to Mexico City, London and Nassau. Western had hubs at Los Angeles International Airport, Salt Lake City International Airport, and the former Stapleton International Airport in Denver. Before it merged with Delta Air Lines in 1987 it was headquartered at Los Angeles International Airport (LAX). Throughout the company's history, its slogan was "Western Airlines...The Only Way to Fly!"

== History ==
=== Western Air Express ===
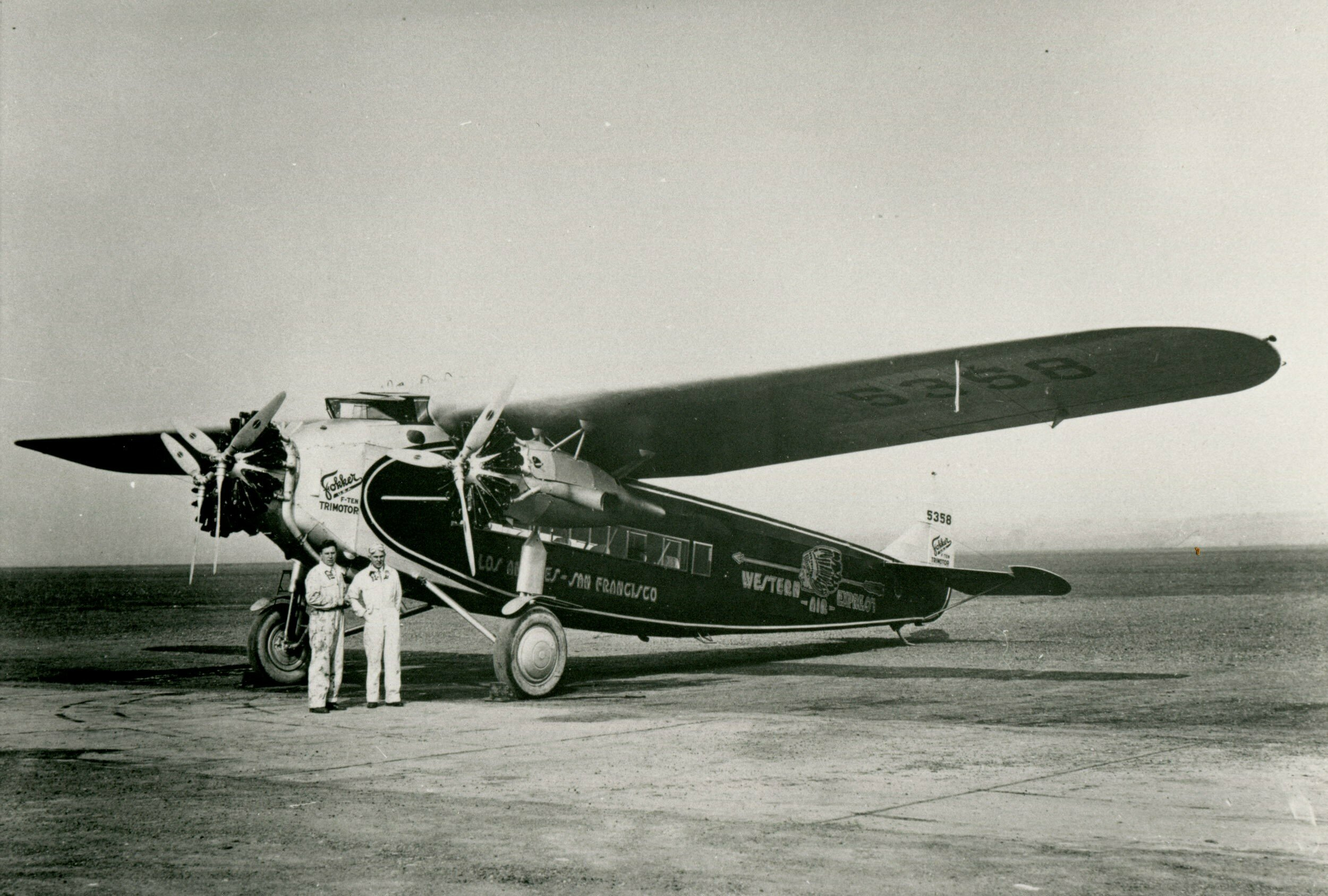
A Fokker F-10 aircraft operated by the airline's precursor, Western Air Express, in the late 1920s.

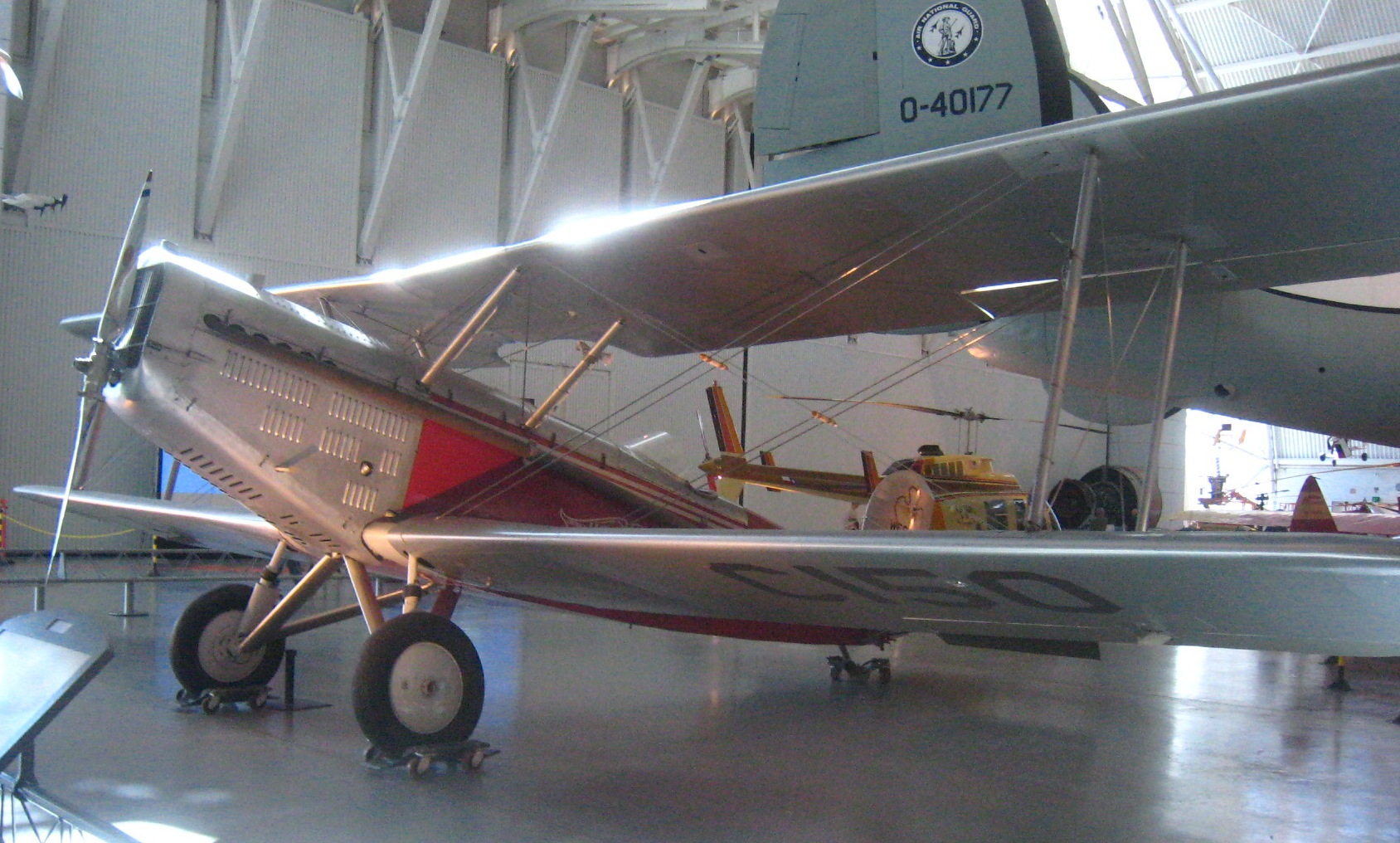
Douglas M-2 operated by Western Air Express.

In 1925, the United States Postal Service began to give airline contracts to carry airmail throughout the country. Western Airlines first incorporated in 1925 as Western Air Express by Harris Hanshue. It applied for, and was awarded, the 650-mile (1,046 km) long Contract Air Mail Route #4 (CAM-4) from Salt Lake City, Utah, to Los Angeles. On 17 April 1926, Western's first flight took place with a Douglas M-2 airplane. It began offering passenger services a month later, when the first commercial passenger flight took place at Woodward Field. Ben F. Redman (then president of the Salt Lake City Chamber of Commerce) and J.A. Tomlinson perched atop U.S. mail sacks and flew with pilot C.N. "Jimmy" James on his regular eight-hour mail delivery flight to Los Angeles. By the mid-1930s, Western Air Express had introduced new Boeing 247 aircraft. Western Air Express built and owned Vail Airport in Montebello, CA, from 1926 to 1930 and the Alhambra Airport in southern California from 1930 to 1931. Western Air Express operated a seaplane route out of Hamilton Cove Seaplane Base on Catalina Island, California, from 1928 to 1930

=== Transcontinental & Western Air ===
The company reincorporated in 1928 as Western Air Express Corp. In 1930 it purchased Standard Air Lines, a subsidiary of Aero Corp. of Ca., founded in 1926 by Paul E. Richter, Jack Frye and Walter Hamilton. WAE with Fokker aircraft merged with Transcontinental Air Transport to form Transcontinental & Western Air (TWA, later known as Trans World Airlines).

=== General Air Lines ===
In 1934 Western Air Express was severed from TWA and changed its name to General Air Lines, returning to the name Western Air Express after several months. In a 1934 press release by the company, it called itself the Western Air Division of General Air Lines. Its route map ran San Diego to Los Angeles to Salt Lake City.

=== Western Airlines ===
In 1937 Western merged National Parks Airways, which extended its route north from Salt Lake to Great Falls, and, in 1941, across the border to Lethbridge, Alberta. In 1941 Western Air Express changed its name to Western Air Lines and later to Western Airlines. (In 1967–69 Western called itself Western Airlines International.)

In 1944 Western acquired a controlling interest in Inland Air Lines, which became a subsidiary with Inland's schedules in Western timetables until Inland was merged into Western in 1952. Western started flying Los Angeles to San Francisco in 1943, so the Western/Inland route map was a W: San Francisco south to San Diego, north from San Diego to Lethbridge, Alberta in Canada, south to Denver, and northeast to Huron. (It extended to Minneapolis in 1947.)

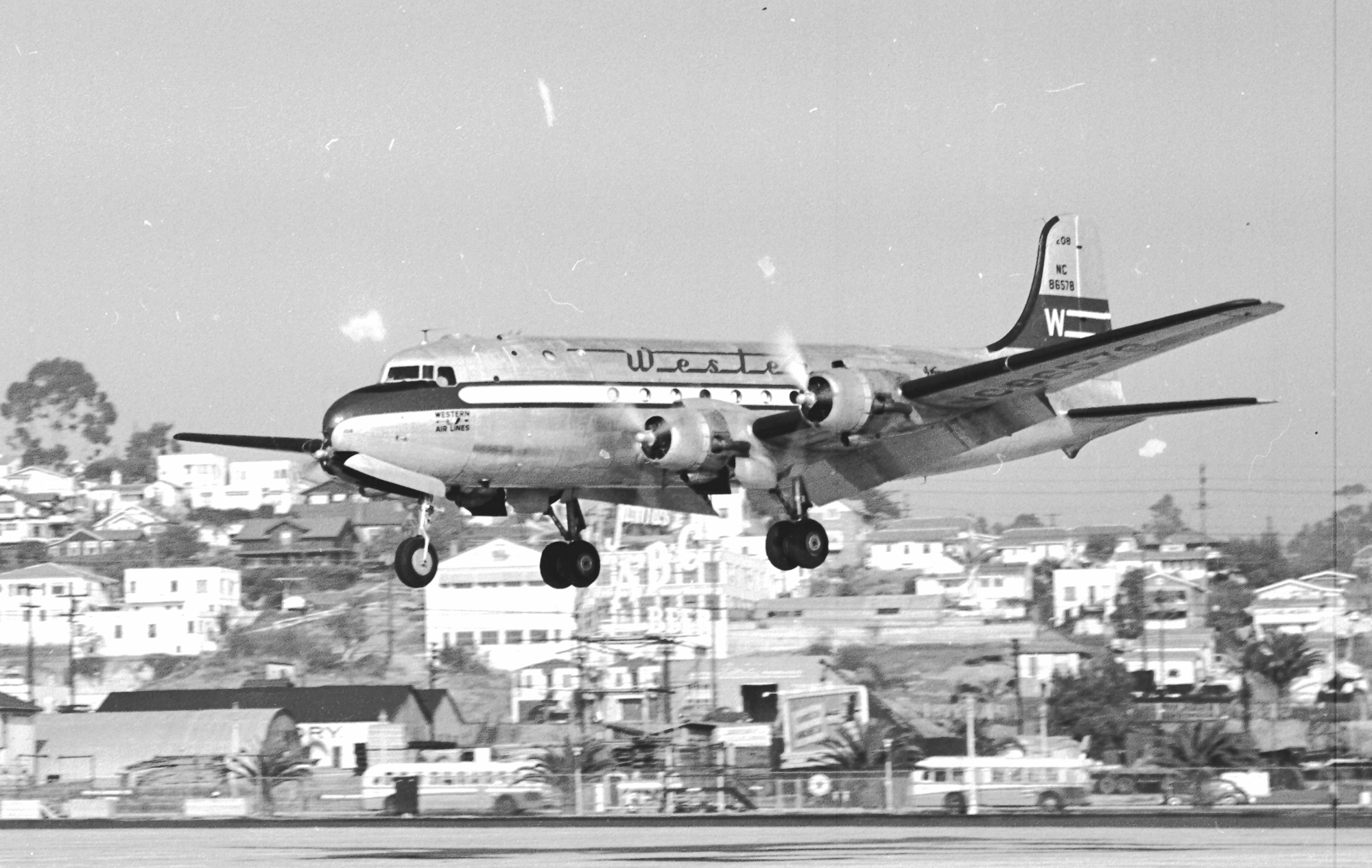
Douglas DC 4 landing at San Diego

In 1946, Western was awarded a route from Los Angeles to Denver via Las Vegas, but in 1947 financial problems forced Western to sell the route, and Douglas DC-6 delivery positions, to United Air Lines. In 1947 Western extended the left arm of the W north to Seattle, and added San Diego to Yuma for a few years; in 1950 it extended the middle of the W north to Edmonton. It finally cut across the W in 1953 when DC-6Bs started a one-stop flight MSP-SLC-LAX the time (August) Western was serving 38 airports. In 1956 it resumed flights west out of Denver, to San Francisco via Salt Lake. In 1957 it began Los Angeles to Mexico City nonstop DC-6Bs, and in December 1957 it began Denver-Phoenix-San Diego.

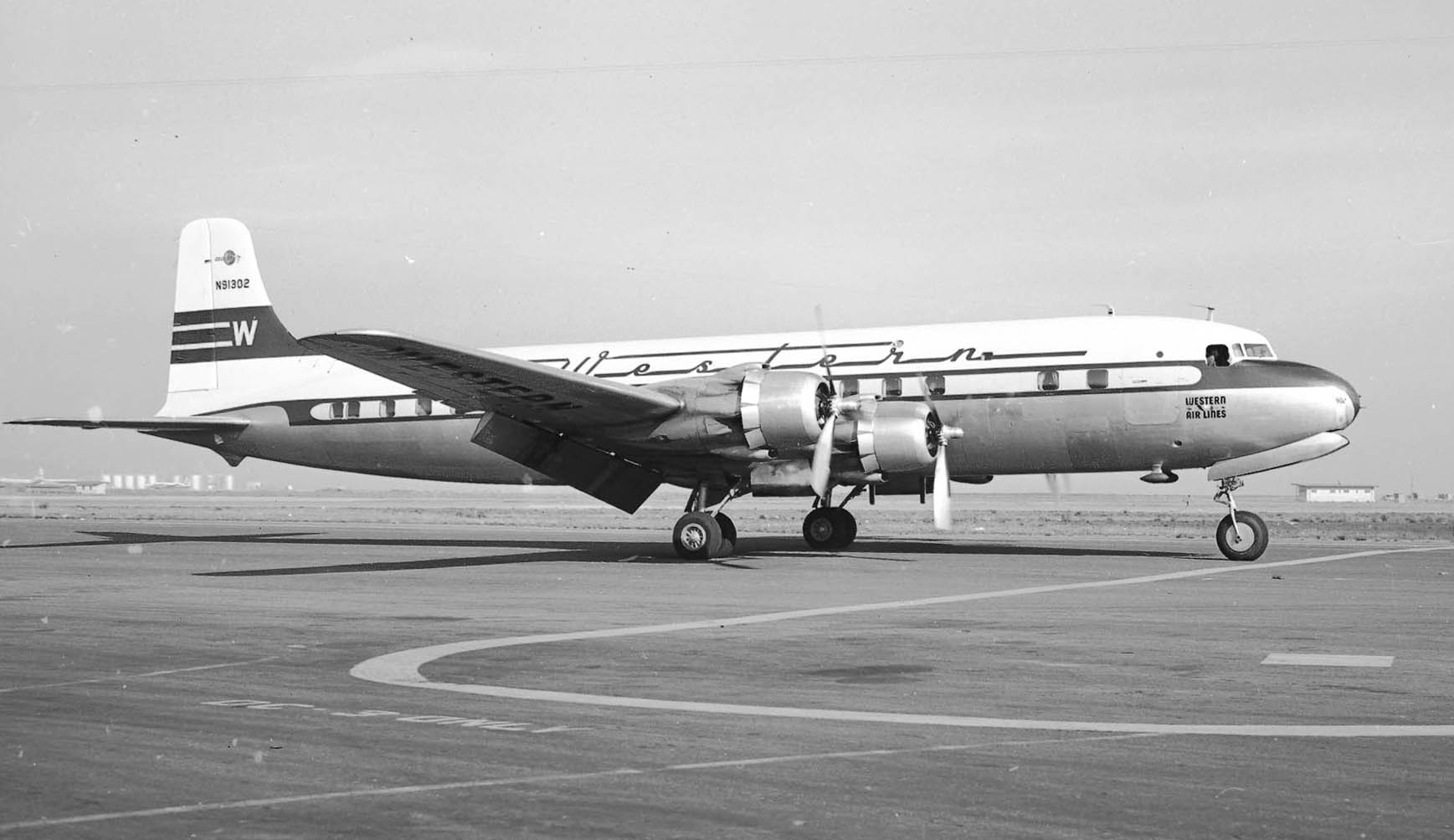
Douglas DC-6B

The airline's president was Terrell "Terry" Drinkwater. Drinkwater got into a dispute with the administration in Washington D.C. that hampered WAL's growth. Pressured in a famous phone call by President Dwight D. Eisenhower to "buy American made aircraft", Drinkwater reportedly responded: "Mr. President, you run your country and let me run my airline!" For years after this exchange, the federal Civil Aeronautics Board (CAB) would not award Western new routes while its competitors, including United and American, grew enormous even though all Western airliners were of U.S. manufacture while its competitors' fleets included aircraft produced in Europe.

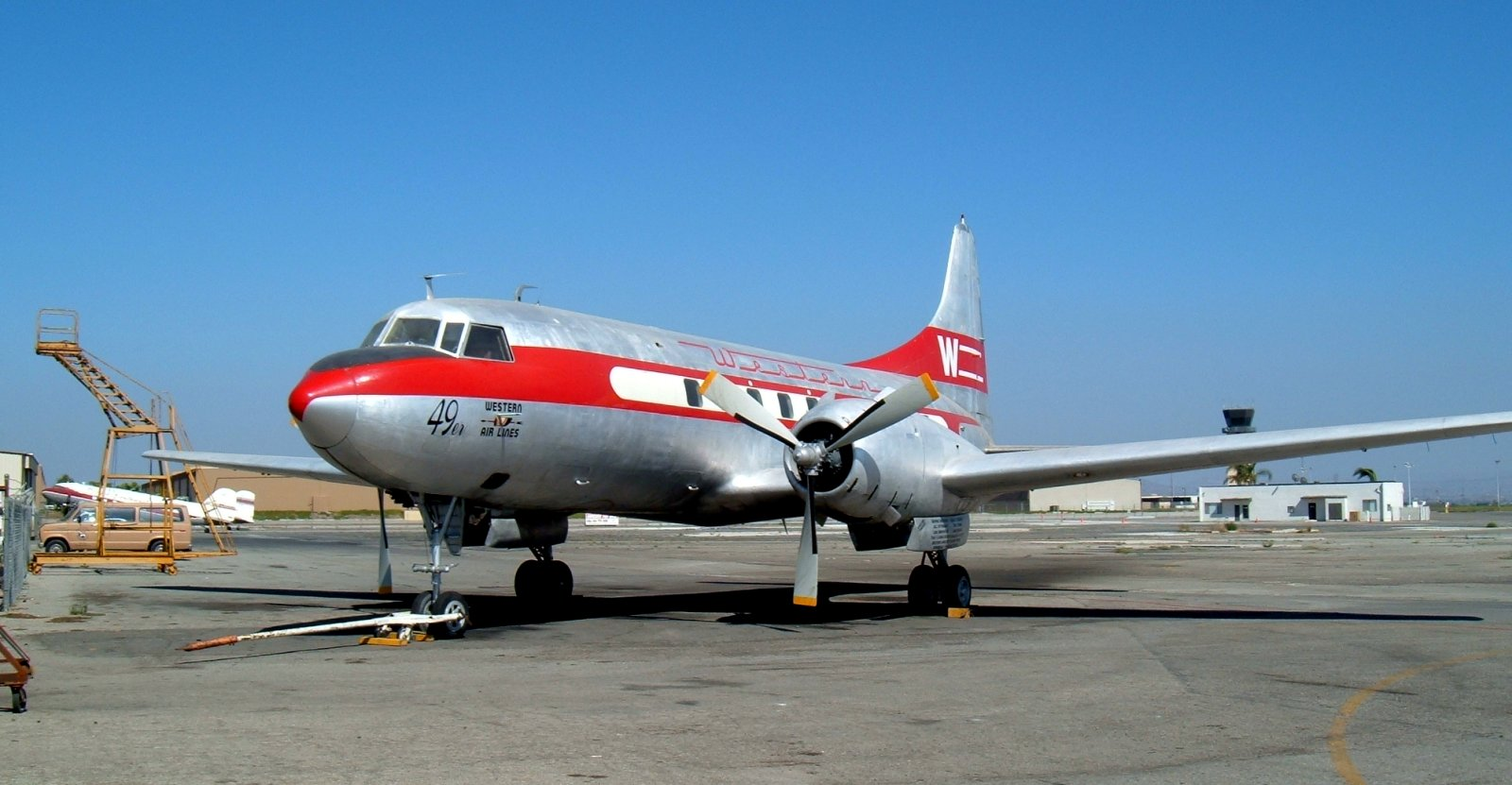
A Convair 240 restored in Western Airlines original colors

In June 1960, Western Airlines introduced Boeing 707s (707-139s) between Los Angeles, San Francisco, Portland and Seattle. 720B nonstops MSP-SFO and MSP-LAX began in 1966, along with LAX-Acapulco. In 1967 WAL acquired Pacific Northern Airlines (PNA, the successor of Woodley Airways) based in Seattle, Washington, its primary routes being Anchorage - Seattle nonstop as well as Anchorage - Juneau - Seattle and Anchorage - Juneau - Ketchikan - Seattle with PNA flying Boeing 720 jetliners on these routes with the airline also operating nonstop Kodiak, Alaska - Seattle service with Lockheed Constellation propliners. Also in 1967, Western added Vancouver, and in 1969 it began nonstop flights between several California airports and Hawaii. In June 1968 the scheduled links called at 42 airports.

In the late 1960s, Western aimed for an all-jet fleet, adding Boeing 707-320s, 727-200s and 737-200s to its 720Bs. The two leased B707-139s had been sold in favor of the turbofan-powered Boeing 720B. Lockheed L-188 Electra turboprops were replaced with new 737-200s. In 1973 Western added nine McDonnell Douglas DC-10-10s, marketing its wide-body cabins as "DC-10 Spaceships". They were configured with 46 first-class seats, 193 coach, and a lower level galley. From 1976 to 1981 the DC-10s flew Los Angeles to Miami nonstop.

Starting in 1968 future billionaire Kirk Kerkorian was a major investor in Western Airlines. Kerkorian had previously controlled Trans International Airlines, making his first fortune by selling it to insurance conglomerate Transamerica Corporation earlier in 1968. Kerkorian built a large stake in Western from 1968 to 1970 and took control of the board, reshaping management (including side-lining Drinkwater) and, among other changes, cancelling Western's orders for Boeing 747s, helping Western minimize the impact of the widebody-driven capacity glut of the early 1970s. He remained a power at Western until 1976, when he sold his remaining stock back to the company.

In 1969, Western Airlines opened negotiations to merge with American Airlines. However, the merger was opposed by rival airlines such as Continental Airlines and the United States Department of Justice Antitrust Division under Richard Wellington McLaren. President Richard Nixon's attorney Herbert W. Kalmbach suggested that the antitrust suit would be dropped in exchange for a $75,000 campaign contribution to the Committee for the Re-Election of the President, which American Airlines CEO George A. Spater agreed to. However, the merger was nonetheless rejected in a 4–1 decision by the Civil Aeronautics Board in July 1972.

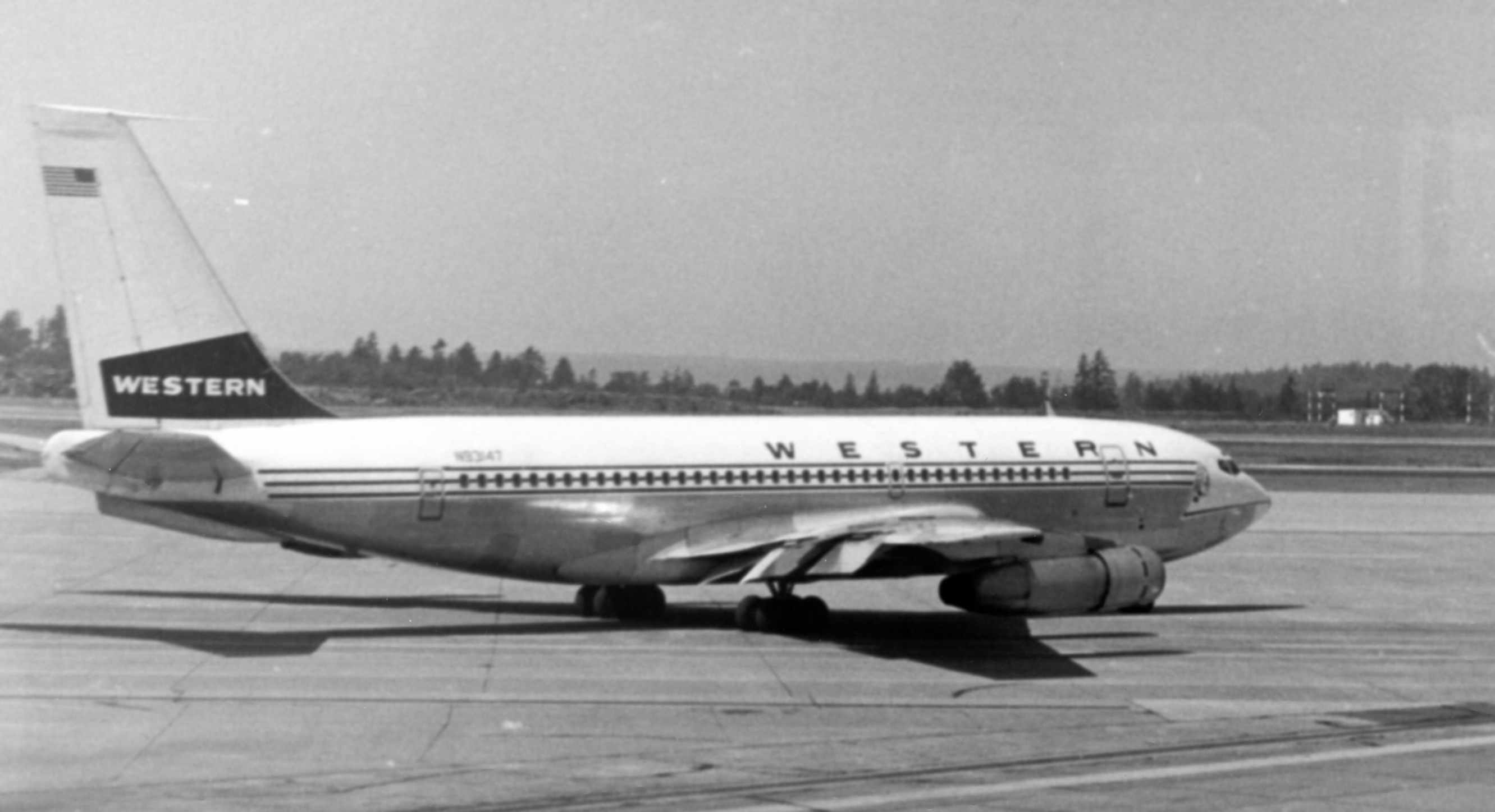
Boeing 720B at Seattle airport in 1972

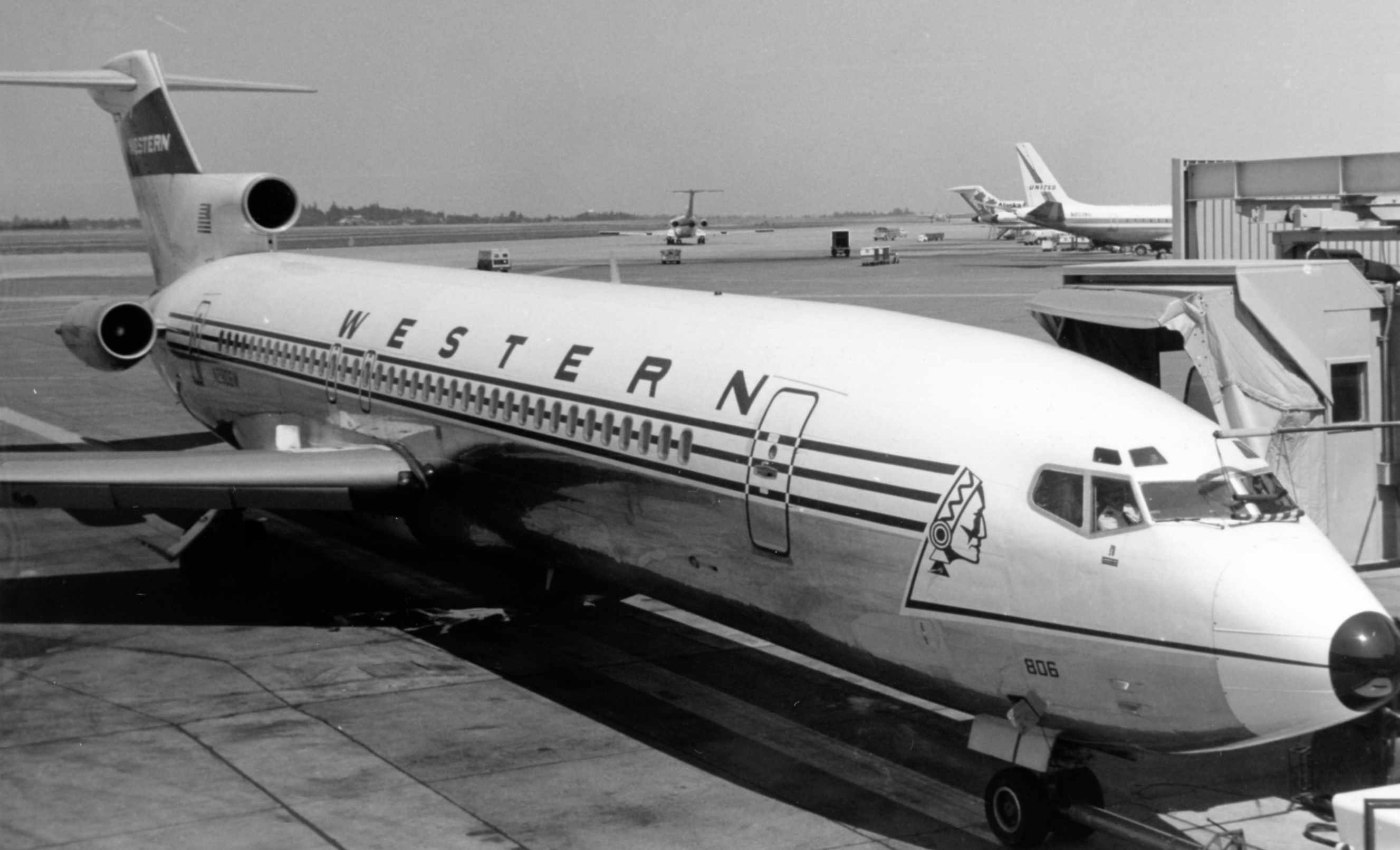
Boeing 727

Western was headquartered in Los Angeles, California. After the Airline Deregulation Act in 1978, the airline's hubs were reduced to two airports: Los Angeles International Airport and Salt Lake City International Airport. Before deregulation, Western had small hubs in Anchorage, Alaska, Denver, Las Vegas, Minneapolis/St. Paul and San Francisco. In spring 1987, shortly before Western was acquired by Delta Air Lines, the airline had two hubs, a major operation in Salt Lake City and a small hub in Los Angeles.

At its peak in the 1970s and 1980s, Western flew to cities across the western United States, and to Mexico (Mexico City, Puerto Vallarta, Acapulco, Ixtapa/Zihuatanejo and Mazatlán), Alaska (Anchorage, Fairbanks, Juneau, Ketchikan, Kodiak and other Alaskan destinations), Hawaii (Honolulu, Kahului, Kona, and Hilo), and Canada (Vancouver, Calgary and Edmonton). New York City, Washington, D.C., Boston, and Miami were added on the east coast as well as Chicago and St. Louis, and cities in Texas (Austin, Dallas/Ft. Worth, El Paso, Houston and San Antonio), and New Orleans in the south. Western had many intrastate flights in California, competing with Pacific Southwest Airlines (PSA), Air California/AirCal, Air West/Hughes Airwest and United Airlines. In addition, Western operated "Islander" service with Boeing 707-320s, Boeing 720Bs and McDonnell Douglas DC-10s to Hawaii from a number of cities that previously did not have direct flights to the 50th state. In 1973, Western flew nonstop between Honolulu and Anchorage, Los Angeles, Oakland, California, San Diego, San Francisco and San Jose, California and one-stop between Honolulu and Las Vegas, Minneapolis/St. Paul, Phoenix, Sacramento and Salt Lake City. In 1981, the airline also flew nonstop DC-10s between Vancouver, British Columbia and Honolulu.

One of the smallest jet destinations was West Yellowstone, Montana, near Yellowstone National Park. Western flew Boeing 737-200s to West Yellowstone Airport in the summer, replacing Lockheed L-188 Electras. In the 1970s and 1980s, Western served a number of small cities with 737-200s including Butte, Montana, Casper, Wyoming, Cheyenne, Wyoming, Helena, Montana, Idaho Falls, Idaho, Pierre, South Dakota, Pocatello, Idaho, Rapid City, South Dakota and Sheridan, Wyoming. The 737 replaced Electras to all of these cities. In 1968 the airline was operating nonstop Boeing 720Bs between the Annette Island Airport (serving Ketchikan, Alaska) and Seattle in addition to 720Bs between Juneau and Seattle, and in 1973 was flying 720B nonstops between Kodiak, Alaska and Seattle.

In 1978, Western Airlines and Continental Airlines agreed to merge. A dispute broke out over what to call the combined airline: Western-Continental or Continental-Western, prompting an infamous coin toss. Bob Six, the colorful founder of CAL, demanded that Continental be "tails" in deference to its marketing slogan "We Really Move Our Tail for You! Continental Airlines: the Proud Bird with the Golden Tail". The coin flip turned up "heads". Six was so disappointed he called the merger off.

From October 1980 to October 1981, Western flew Honolulu to Anchorage to London Gatwick Airport with a single McDonnell Douglas DC-10-30; for less than a year starting in April 1981 it flew LGW to Denver, continuing to Las Vegas and Los Angeles. Another international route was Los Angeles to Miami to Nassau, in the Bahamas for a year in 1980–81. Western extended its network to New York City, Washington, D.C. and Boston, as well as to Chicago and St. Louis in the midwest, Albuquerque and El Paso in the west, and Houston, New Orleans, Miami and Fort Lauderdale. In 1987 Western had four Boeing 737-300 round trips between Boston and New York LaGuardia Airport, and a major hub at Salt Lake City International Airport and a small hub at Los Angeles International Airport.

=== Western Express ===
In 1986, Western entered into a code sharing agreement with SkyWest Airlines, a commuter airline. SkyWest (Western Express) Embraer EMB-120 Brasilias and Fairchild Swearingen Metroliners connected to Western mainline flights at Salt Lake City, Los Angeles, Las Vegas, Phoenix, San Diego, and other Western mainline destinations. In spring 1987 SkyWest/Western Express served 36 cities in Arizona, California, Colorado, Montana, Nevada, Utah and Wyoming. Western entered a similar code-sharing agreement with Alaska-based South Central Air, a small commuter airline that operated as Western Express as well, connecting to Western flights at Anchorage. Several cities in southern Alaska including Homer, Kenai, Soldotna were served by South Central Air operating as Western Express. After the acquisition of Western by Delta Air Lines, SkyWest became a Delta Connection code sharing airline.

=== Delta Air Lines merger ===
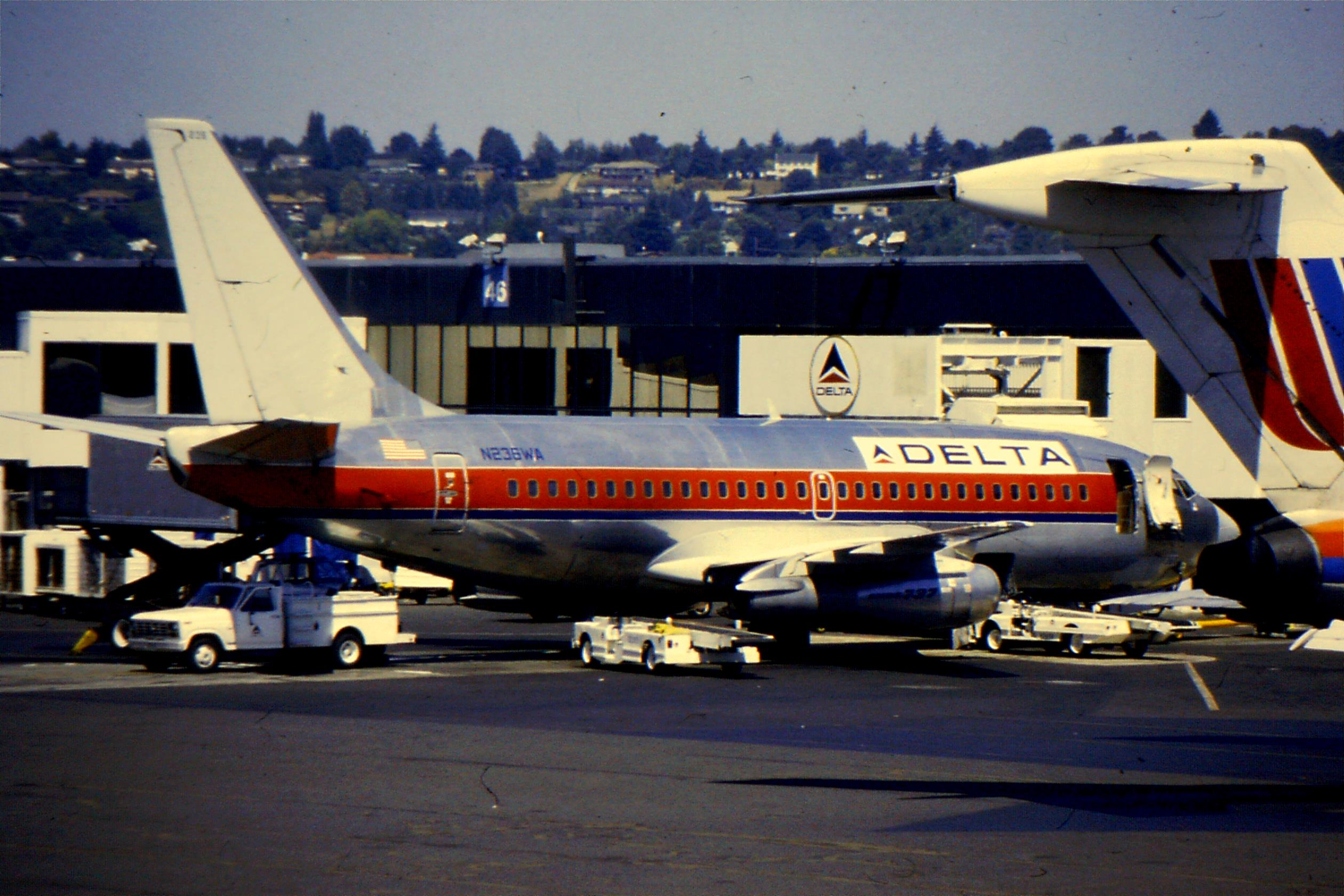
A Boeing 737 in a hybrid Western/Delta livery

In the early 1980s Air Florida tried to buy Western Airlines, but it was able to purchase only 16 percent of the airline's stock. On September 9, 1986, Western Airlines and Delta Air Lines entered into an agreement and plan of merger. The merger agreement was approved by the United States Department of Transportation on December 11, 1986. On December 16, 1986, shareholder approval was conferred and Western Airlines became a wholly owned subsidiary of Delta. The Western brand was discontinued and the employee workforces were fully merged on April 1, 1987. All of Western's aircraft were repainted in Delta's livery, including twelve McDonnell Douglas DC-10s. Delta eventually decided to eliminate the DC-10s from its fleet as it already operated Lockheed L-1011 TriStars, a similar type. Delta retained Western's hubs in Los Angeles and Salt Lake City. Salt Lake City has remained a major hub while Los Angeles was de-hubbed and later regained hub status for Delta.

== Destinations in 1987 ==
This mainline destination list is taken from Western's March 1, 1987, timetable shortly before the merger with Delta Air Lines. The airline's main hub was Salt Lake City International Airport with a smaller hub at Los Angeles International Airport.

- Acapulco, Mexico
- Albuquerque, New Mexico
- Anchorage, Alaska (ANC): Anchorage International Airport
- Austin, Texas (AUS): Robert Mueller Municipal Airport
- Billings, Montana
- Bismarck, North Dakota
- Boise, Idaho
- Boston, Massachusetts (BOS): Logan International Airport
- Bozeman, Montana
- Burbank, California (BUR): Hollywood Burbank Airport, then Burbank/Glendale/Pasadena Airport
- Butte, Montana
- Calgary, Alberta, Canada (YYC): Calgary International Airport
- Casper, Wyoming
- Cheyenne, Wyoming
- Chicago, Illinois (ORD): O'Hare International Airport
- Colorado Springs, Colorado
- Dallas/Ft. Worth, Texas (DFW): Dallas/Fort Worth International Airport
- Denver, Colorado (DEN): Stapleton International Airport
- Edmonton, Alberta, Canada (YEG): Edmonton International Airport
- El Paso, Texas
- Fairbanks, Alaska
- Fresno, California
- Great Falls, Montana
- Guadalajara, Mexico
- Helena, Montana
- Honolulu, Oahu, Hawaii (HNL): Honolulu International Airport
- Houston, Texas (IAH): George Bush Intercontinental Airport
- Idaho Falls, Idaho
- Ixtapa/Zihuatanejo, Mexico
- Jackson, Wyoming
- Juneau, Alaska
- Kansas City, Missouri
- Kahului, Maui, Hawaii
- Kalispell, Montana
- Las Vegas, Nevada (LAS): McCarran International Airport
- Los Angeles, California (LAX): Los Angeles International Airport - Secondary hub
- Mazatlan, Mexico
- Mexico City, Mexico
- Minneapolis/St. Paul, Minnesota (MSP): Minneapolis–Saint Paul International Airport
- Missoula, Montana
- New York City, New York (JFK): John F. Kennedy International Airport
- New York City, New York (LGA): LaGuardia Airport
- Oakland, California (OAK): Oakland International Airport
- Oklahoma City, Oklahoma
- Omaha, Nebraska
- Ontario, California (ONT): Ontario International Airport
- Orange County, California (SNA): John Wayne Airport
- Palm Springs, California
- Pasco, Washington (Tri-Cities area)
- Phoenix, Arizona (PHX): Phoenix Sky Harbor International Airport
- Portland, Oregon (PDX): Portland International Airport
- Puerto Vallarta, Mexico
- Rapid City, South Dakota
- Reno, Nevada
- Sacramento, California
- Salt Lake City, Utah (SLC): Salt Lake City International Airport - Primary hub
- St. Louis, Missouri (STL): St. Louis Lambert International Airport
- San Antonio, Texas
- San Diego, California (SAN): San Diego International Airport
- San Francisco, California (SFO): San Francisco International Airport
- San Jose, California (SJC): Norman Y. Mineta San Jose International Airport
- Seattle/Tacoma, Washington (SEA): Seattle–Tacoma International Airport
- Sioux Falls, South Dakota
- Spokane, Washington
- Tucson, Arizona
- Tulsa, Oklahoma
- Vancouver, British Columbia, Canada (YVR): Vancouver International Airport
- Washington, D.C. (IAD): Washington Dulles International Airport
- Washington, D.C. (DCA): Ronald Reagan Washington National Airport
- Wichita, Kansas

Western had a flight between IAD in Washington, D.C., and DCA at one point in 1985. In 1987 the airline had four round trip flights a day between Boston and New York LaGuardia.

== Former destinations ==
Western timetables from the 1940s to the 1980s list service to the following at different times:

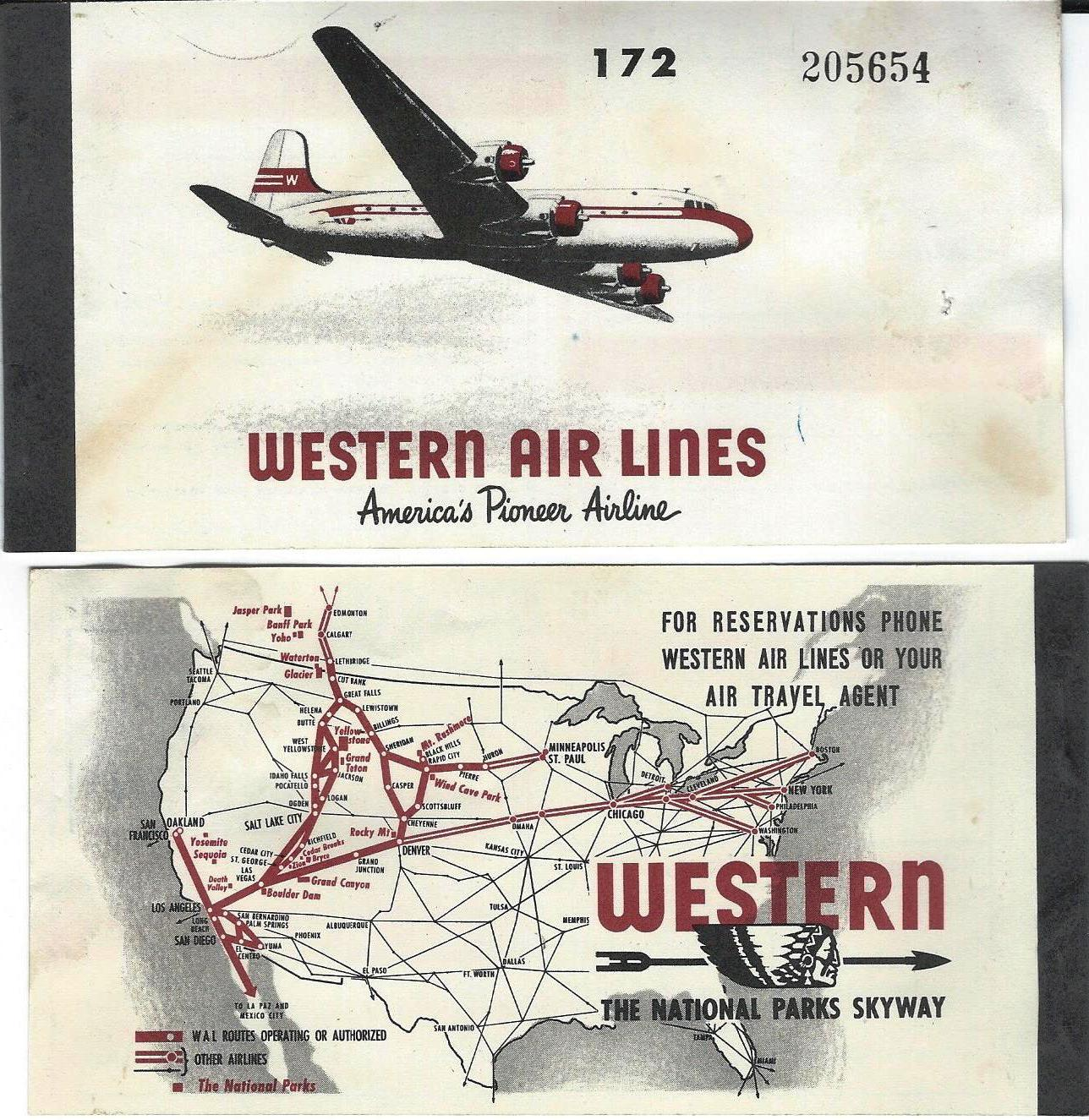
Covers of a 1940s ticket book

- Alliance, Nebraska
- Baltimore, Maryland (BWI): Baltimore/Washington International Thurgood Marshall Airport
- Brookings, South Dakota
- Cedar City, Utah
- Cordova, Alaska
- Cut Bank, Montana
- El Centro, California
- Fort Lauderdale, Florida (FLL): Fort Lauderdale-Hollywood International Airport
- Grand Junction, Colorado
- Homer, Alaska
- Hot Springs, South Dakota
- Huron, South Dakota
- Juneau, Alaska
- Kenai, Alaska
- Ketchikan, Alaska
- King Salmon, Alaska
- Kodiak, Alaska
- Lethbridge, Alberta, Canada (first international destination)
- Lewistown, Montana
- Logan, Utah
- London, England (LGW): London Gatwick Airport (nonstop DC-10 service to Anchorage and Denver, one stop service to Honolulu via Anchorage and direct to Las Vegas and Los Angeles via Denver)
- Mankato, Minnesota
- Miami, Florida (MIA): Miami International Airport
- Nassau, Bahamas (one stop DC-10 to Los Angeles via Miami)
- New Orleans, Louisiana
- Ogden, Utah
- Prudhoe Bay, Alaska
- Rochester, Minnesota
- Scottsbluff, Nebraska
- Spearfish, South Dakota
- Twin Falls, Idaho
- West Yellowstone, Montana (served on a seasonal basis primarily during the summer months)
- Yakutat, Alaska
- Yuma, Arizona

== Revenue passenger miles ==
Revenue passenger miles in millions(scheduled flights only)
	Western	Pacific Northern Airlines	Inland Air Lines
1951	216	138	41
1955	514	123	(merged into Western in 1952)
1960	1027	116	
1965	2040	198	
1970	5072	(merged into Western in 1967)	
1975	6998		
1980	8790		
1985	10422		

== Advertising ==
Western contributed to popular culture with its 1956 advertising slogan, "It's the oooooonly way to fly!" Spoken by Wally Bird, an animated bird hitching a ride atop the fuselage of a Western airliner, and voiced by veteran actor Shepard Menken, the phrase soon found its way into animated cartoons by Warner Bros. (Crow's Feat) and Hanna-Barbera. Another famous advertising campaign by the airline centered on Star Trek icons William Shatner and Leonard Nimoy. Some of the carrier's last television ads, shortly before the merger with Delta, featured actor/comedian Rodney Dangerfield.

In the 1970s Western called itself "the champagne airline" because champagne was offered free of charge to every passenger over age 21. (Actor Jim Backus uttered the "It's the only way to fly!" phrase while piloting an airplane, somewhat inebriated, in the 1963 film It's A Mad, Mad, Mad, Mad World.)

Western Airlines was famous for its "Flying W" corporate identity and aircraft livery. Introduced in 1970, the scheme featured a large red "W" that fused into a red cheatline running the length of an all-white fuselage. This new corporate identity was the subject of litigation by Winnebago Industries, which contended the new "Flying W" was too similar to its own stylized "W" logo. In the 1980s Western Airlines slightly modified the scheme by stripping the white fuselage to bare metal, retaining the red "Flying W" (with a dark blue shadow). This color scheme was known as "Bud Lite" due to its resemblance to a popular beer's can design.

Western Airlines was a favorite first class carrier for Hollywood movie stars and frequently featured them in its on board magazine, "Western's World". Marilyn Monroe and many other silver screen actors were frequent flyers and the airline capitalized on it. Western had a famous flyer out of Seattle: Captain "Red" Dodge. Red worked previously as a helicopter test pilot, and got involved with flying for the Central Intelligence Agency (CIA) in his later years when he wasn't flying as captain on the DC-10. The movie Breakout starring Charles Bronson was based on his daring airlift of a CIA operative out of the courtyard of a Mexican prison. The Mexican government tried to extradite Dodge back to face charges. Red became wealthy leasing government storage units with unlimited government business but never again flew to Mexico.

The airline was promoted in the Carpenters promotional video for the track "I Need to Be in Love", released in 1976. The video shows exterior footage of a DC-10 in takeoff and landing shots, as well as seating promotions for Western's FiftyFair seating product, with shots of a cabin setting depicting what looks like business class of the DC-10.

During the 1980s, destination flights aboard Western Airlines were featured as prizes on televised game shows, including The Price Is Right and The $25,000 Pyramid.

== Fleet ==
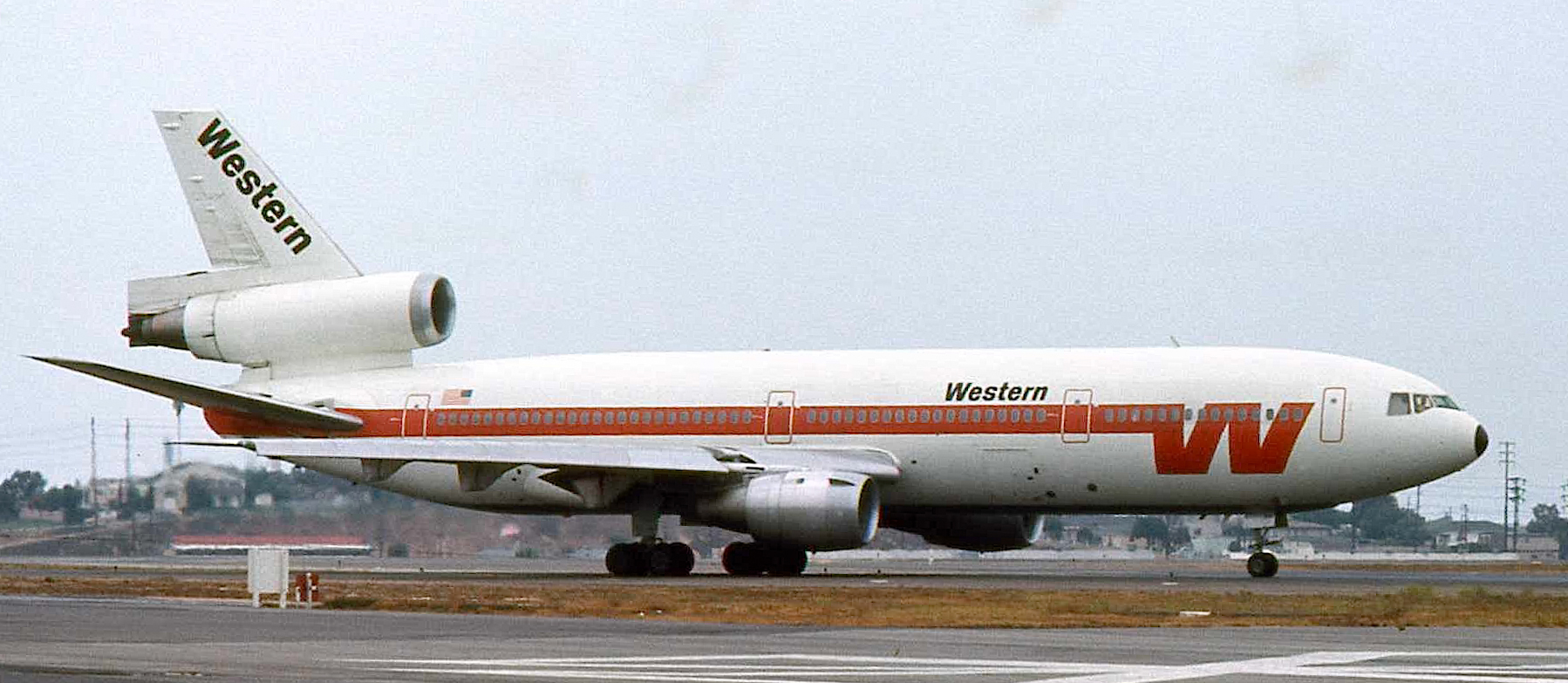
Western Airlines marketed its DC-10s "Spaceships" for its widebody comfort

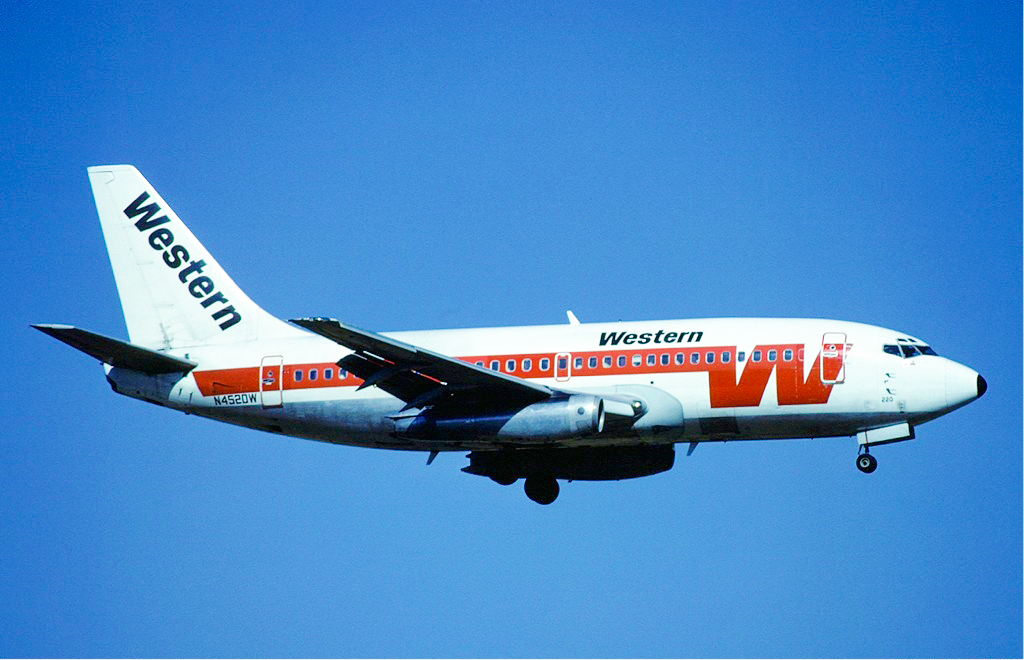
Boeing 737-200 landing in Salt Lake City

=== Fleet in 1986 ===
In 1986 Western Airlines' fleet was 78 jets:

Western Airlines fleet in 1986
Aircraft	In service	Orders
Boeing 727-200	46	—
Boeing 737-200	19	40
Boeing 737-300	3	14
McDonnell Douglas DC-10-10	10	—
Total	78	54

- Western used a McDonnell Douglas DC-10-30 starting in 1981 to serve London, England, United Kingdom. The DC-10-30 was the largest plane type ever flown by Western.

=== Fleet in 1970 ===
In 1970 Western Airlines operated 75 aircraft:

- 5 Boeing 707-320C (not included were 5 Boeing 707-347C ordered (assigned registration N1506W through N1510W) that were cancelled and acquired by the RCAF).
- 29 Boeing 720 (720 turbojet and 720B turbofan models; the 720s were ex-Pacific Northern)
- 6 Boeing 727-200
- 30 Boeing 737-200
- 5 Lockheed L-188 Electra (included passenger, freighter and passenger/freighter combi aircraft versions. Only turboprop type operated by the airline)

=== Earlier piston fleet ===
Western used a variety of piston-powered airliners including Boeing 247Ds, Convair 240s, Douglas DC-3s, DC-4s, DC-6Bs and L-749 Constellations. The Constellations had been operated by Pacific Northern Airlines and served smaller Western Airlines destinations in Alaska such as Cordova, Homer, Kenai, King Salmon, Kodiak and Yakutat from Anchorage or Seattle in the late 1960s.

== Accidents and incidents ==
- December 15, 1936: Seven died when a Western Air Express Boeing 247 crashed just below Hardy Ridge on Lone Peak near Salt Lake City, Utah. The major parts of the aircraft were hurled over the ridge and fell over a thousand feet into a basin below.
- January 12, 1937: Western Air Express Flight 7, a Boeing 247 flying from Salt Lake City to Burbank, crashed near Newhall, California, killing five of the 13 people on board, including adventurer and documentary filmmaker Martin Johnson of Martin and Osa Johnson fame.
- December 15, 1942: A Western Airlines transport crashed near Fairfield, Utah, approximately 50 miles south of Salt Lake City, Utah, on the way to Los Angeles, California. The plane took off at 1:05 a.m. and was reported missing approximately 15 minutes later. Of the 19 passengers and crew aboard, 17 died.
- November 13, 1946: Western Airlines Flight 23 crashed into the mountains 12 miles south of Gorman, California, while descending towards Burbank Airport. All 11 on board were killed.
- December 24, 1946: Western Air Lines Flight 44 crashed into the Laguna Mountains while descending towards San Diego. All 12 on board were killed. The CAB investigation determined that the pilot misjudged his position relative to the mountains, and flew too low to clear terrain.
- April 20, 1953: Western Air Lines Flight 636, flying in the night, on the last leg of a Los Angeles-San Francisco-Oakland itinerary, descended below the prescribed minimum altitude of 500 ft and crashed into the waters of San Francisco Bay, killing eight of ten people aboard the Douglas DC-6.
- February 26, 1954: Western Air Lines Flight 34, a Convair CV-240-1 crashed near Wright, Wyoming, killing 6 passengers and 3 crew members.
- February 25, 1971 – Western Air Lines Flight 329, a Boeing 737, was hijacked by a passenger, demanding to be taken to Cuba but instead landed in Canada.
- March 31, 1971 – Western Air Lines Flight 366, a Boeing 720-047B flying from Los Angeles to Ontario, California, on a pilot proficiency check flight, yawed and rolled out of control, and crashed while in the process of executing a 3-engine missed-approach from a simulated engine-out instrument approach. The five crew members and only occupants died in the crash.
- May 5, 1972 – Western Airlines Flight 407, a Boeing 737, was hijacked by a man demanding to be taken to North Vietnam. After refueling in Tampa, Florida, the plane went to Cuba.
- June 2, 1972: Western Airlines Flight 701 from Los Angeles to Seattle was hijacked by Willie Roger Holder, a Vietnam War veteran, and his girlfriend Catherine Marie Kerkow. The hijackers claimed they had a bomb in an attaché case and demanded $500,000 and that Angela Davis, who was then on trial, be freed. After allowing half the passengers to get off in San Francisco and the other half to get off in New York on a re-fueling stop, they flew on to Algeria, where they were granted political asylum, joining the International Section of the Black Panther Party. It was and still remains the longest-distance hijacking in American history. Later, $488,000 of the ransom money was returned to American officials.
- March 31, 1975: Western Flight 470 was landing at Casper Airport when it overshot the runway, and struck a shallow irrigation ditch before stopping about 800 feet beyond the departure end of the runway. Weather conditions at the time were at minimum visibility with light snow. The Boeing 737-200 was written off beyond repair. Four passengers suffered various injuries.
- July 31, 1979: Western Airlines Flight 44 departed Los Angeles International Airport en route to Denver, Colorado, and Billings, Montana, via several other intermediate stops and then mistakenly landed at Buffalo, Wyoming, instead of Sheridan, Wyoming, which was the intended destination. No injuries occurred and the only damage was to the ramp at the airport, which was not designed to support the weight of the Boeing 737-200 jetliner. The incident prompted a legal battle and subsequent landmark aviation ruling of Ferguson v. NTSB.
- October 31, 1979: Western Airlines Flight 2605 crashed while landing at Mexico City International Airport in Mexico City, killing 72. The crew landed the DC-10 on a closed runway and it collided with construction vehicles during the attempted go-around.

== See also ==
- List of defunct airlines of the United States
- Inland Air Lines
- Pacific Northern Airlines
- Delta Air Lines
