= Helen Fisher (composer) =

New Zealand composer and music teacher

Helen Wynfreda Fisher (born 1942) is a New Zealand composer and music teacher.

== Life ==
Helen Fisher grew up in Māpua, Nelson, and attended secondary school in Wellington. She graduated from the University of Canterbury in 1964 with a degree in English and taught English, music and French in New Zealand and Canadian secondary schools. She married and raised three daughters, but continued her studies in music at Victoria University of Wellington with Ross Harris, David Farquhar and Jack Body. In 1987 she won first prize in the Victoria University's Composers' Competition with Woodwind Trio and in 1989 won second prize for Pounamu.

She graduated in composition in 1991 and began working as a composer. Her compositions have been performed internationally. In 1990 and 1991, Fisher held the Arts Council residency of Composer-in-Schools in the Wellington area. In 1993, she co-founded the first New Zealand Composing Women's Festival.

== Works ==
Fisher's compositions often blend Māori and European traditions. She composes for vocal and instrumental ensembles and also for dance theatre. Selected works include:

- Te Tangi A Te Matui (1986)
- Woodwind trio (1987)
- Pounamu (1989) for SSAATB choir, alto soloist and koauau
- Taku Wana (1998) for two mezzo-sopranos, Kai-karanga, taonga puoro (traditional Maori instruments), flute/piccolo, bodhran, string quartet
- Tete Kura (2000)
- Otari (2005) for solo harp
- Bone of Contention, dance work for mezzo-soprano and ensemble
- Ko Wharepapa Te Maunga for brass octet
- Matairangi-1 for cello and piano
- Matairangi-2 for flute, viola and harp
- Muriranga-whenua for two flutes
- Nga Taniwha bicultural work for dance and school instrumentalists
- Nga Tapuwae o Kupe (The Footprints of Kupe) for school choir, instruments and dance
- String Quartet

Her music has been recorded and issued on CD, including:

- Matairangi – Helen Fisher Chamber Music
- Taku Wana – The Enduring Spirit, Atoll
