= Jack Frye =

American aviation pioneer (1904–1959)

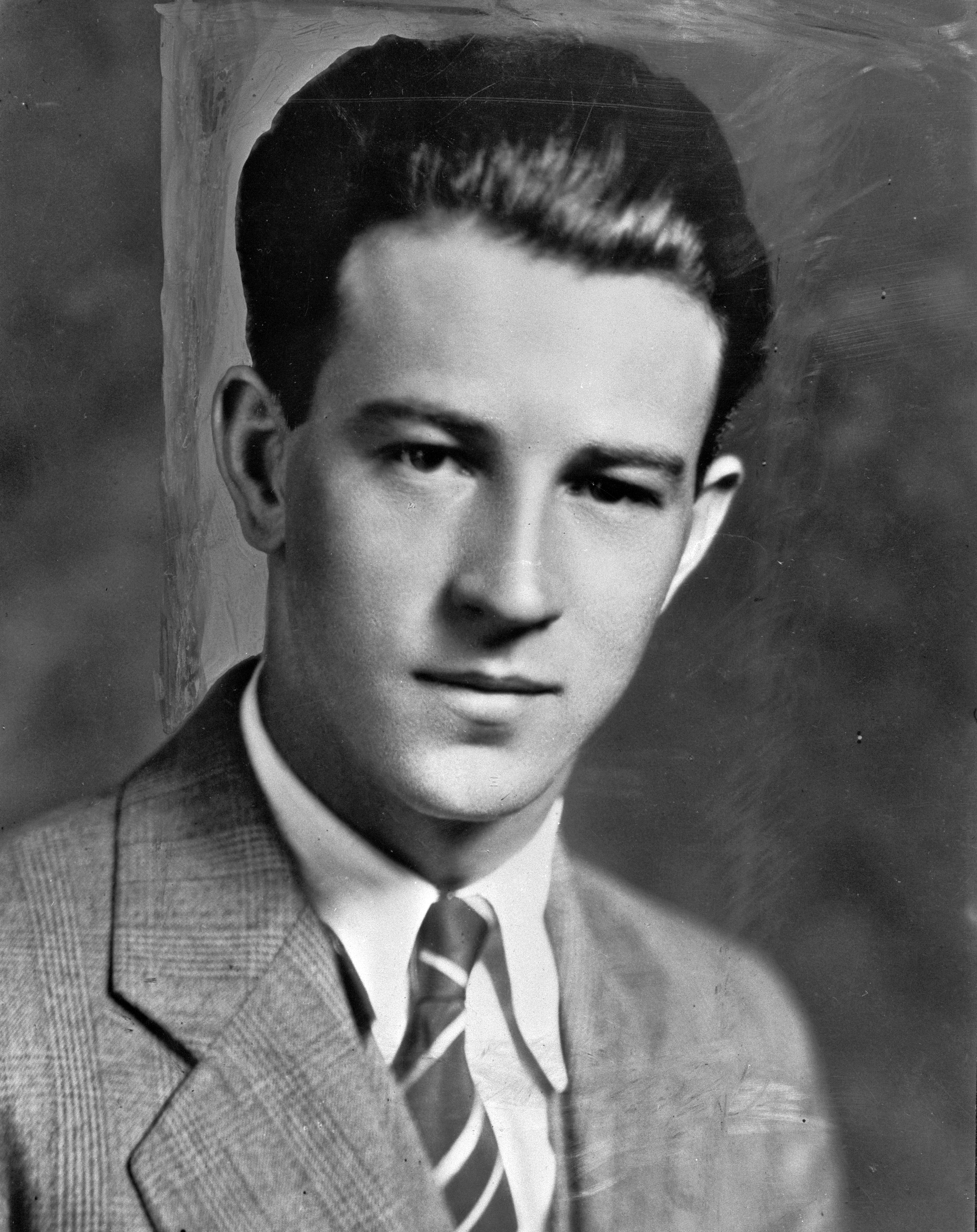
- Born: March 18, 1904; Sweetwater, Oklahoma, U.S.
- Died: February 3, 1959 (aged 54); Tucson, Arizona, U.S.
- Occupation: TWA president (1934–1947)
- Known for: Airline pioneer
- Spouses: Debbie Greer (m. 1924; div. 1932) "Jean" LaCoste (m. 1932; div. 1939) Helen Varner Vanderbilt (m. 1941; div. 1949) Emily Nevada Smith (m. 1950)
- Children: 1
- Awards: Presidential Medal of Merit; International Air & Space Hall of Fame; National Aviation Hall of Fame

William John Frye (March 18, 1904 – February 3, 1959) was an American aviation pioneer in the airline industry. He founded Standard Air Lines which eventually took him into a merger with Trans World Airlines (TWA). He is credited for turning TWA into a world-class airline during his tenure as president from 1934 to 1947. Frye was called "The Flying President" among his peers. At age 24, he was and to this day remains the youngest airline executive of all time.

== Early life ==
Frye was born in Sweetwater, Oklahoma on March 18, 1904, to cattle ranchers William and Nellie Frye. He had a younger brother, Donald, and a younger sister, Ople. After his mother Nellie's death in 1912, the family moved to Wheeler, Texas to live with grandparents.

Frye enlisted in the United States Army Corps of Engineers in 1921, and was discharged as a corporal in 1922. In 1922, Frye left for California with his brother Don.

== Aviation career ==
Frye began taking flying lessons in 1923 from instructor Burdett Fuller at Burdett Field in Los Angeles. Frye became good friends with two student pilots at Fuller's, Walter Hamilton and Paul E. Richter. Frye, Hamilton, and Richter pooled their money and formed Aero Corporation of California in 1925. They bought out Fuller's flight school and did everything from flight instruction, banner towing, charter flights and crop dusting. Hamilton, who had been a mechanic for the Duesenberg Motors Company, ran their aircraft maintenance operation. Frye held Transport Pilot Certificate #933 and Richter held Transport Pilot Certificate #501. In 1926, Los Angeles aerial police ticketed Frye for flying less than 1,000 feet above the city.

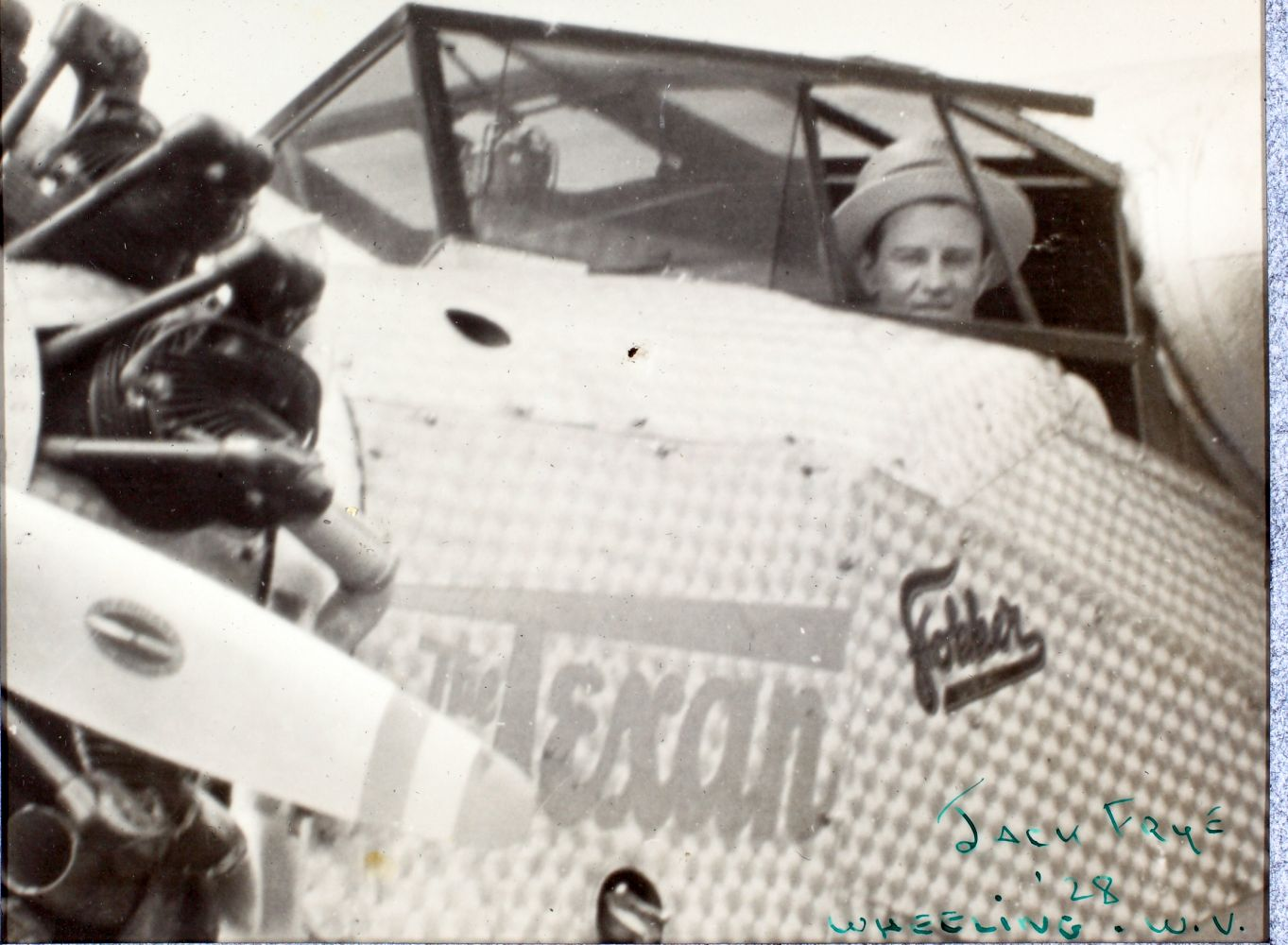
Fokker F-10A NC-9169 "The Texan" with Jack Frye

Frye, Richter, and Hamilton's new goal was to enter the scheduled airline business, so on February 3, 1926, Standard Air Lines was formed as a subsidiary of Aero Corp. Standard Air Lines initially flew single engine Fokker F-7 aircraft from Los Angeles to Tucson with a stop in Phoenix. Within a year, they extended their route to El Paso. In 1929, Standard purchased Fokker F-10A aircraft. Frye and Richter took one of their stock tri-motors and set a commercial aircraft altitude record of 22,680 ft.

Western Air Express bought controlling interest of Aero Corp in early 1930, but still operated Standard as a separate airline. When Western Air Express merged with Transcontinental Air Transport (TAT) in July 1930 to form Transcontinental and Western Air (T&WA), the government forced Western to sell Standard to American Airlines as part of the deal due to its southern route into Texas. However, Frye elected to stay with T&WA and was made Vice President of Operations, Richter became Vice President of Western Division, and Hamilton became Maintenance Superintendent. After the reorganization caused by the Air Mail Scandal of 1934, Frye became president of T&WA in 1934. T&WA eventually became Trans World Airlines (TWA) and was known as "The Airline Run by Flyers".

The airline suffered near disaster after its reputation was hurt in 1931 when Notre Dame coach Knute Rockne died on a T&WA Fokker F-10 tri-motor airplane. In 1932 Jack Frye, representing T&WA, sought a better aircraft and in response to this and other requests, Douglas Aircraft Company developed the Douglas DC-1 Transport twin.

In February 1934, Jack Frye and Eddie Rickenbacker, President of Eastern Airlines, set a transcontinental record of 13 hours and 4 minutes flying the Douglas DC-1 in a publicity stunt for the new airliner. In May 1934, Frye broke his record by flying a Northrop Gamma from Los Angeles to Newark in an elapsed time of 11 hours and 31 minutes. In 1937, Frye and Richter founded "Conquistadors del Cielo" (Conquerors of the Sky), an annual gathering of top airline executives at a dude ranch in Wyoming.

In 1939, desiring greater control of their airline, Frye and Richter approached industrialist and film producer Howard Hughes to buy into the company. (Jack Frye stated in an April 6, 1954, issue of Life magazine that it was Hughes who approached him in regard to investments.) Hughes' interest was airplanes, and his initial involvement was the development and financing of the Lockheed Constellation for TWA. On April 17, 1944, Frye set his third transcontinental record when he and Hughes flew the Constellation prototype on a record 6 hour 58 minute flight from Los Angeles to Washington D.C.

== Marriage ==
Frye married Debbie Greer in Tijuana, Mexico, in 1924; they divorced in 1932. In 1932, Frye married Regine (Jean) LaCoste in Ravena, Missouri, they divorced in 1939. In January 1941, he married Helen Varner Vanderbilt who was previously married to Cornelius Vanderbilt IV. Frye and Helen divorced in January 1950. In July 1950, Frye married his fourth wife, in Hollywood, Florida, New York showgirl and actress Emily Nevada Smith. They had a daughter, Nevajac Frye in 1953, Frye's only child.

== Later life ==
After a dispute with Hughes in 1946, Frye resigned as president of TWA on February 21, 1947. Frye was very well connected in Washington D.C., and soon landed a coveted prize as director of one of the German corporations seized during World War II, in this case the U.S. residual of IG Farben. On April 14, 1947, he was elected chairman of the Board of General Aniline and Film Corp, and its subsidiaries General Dyestuffs Corporation, and Ansco. Frye remained President of General Aniline until 1955, when the Eisenhower administration unwound these holdings through the Office of Alien Property Custodian.

In 1955, Frye formed his own aircraft manufacturing company, the Frye Corporation. In December 1956, Grumman Aircraft agreed to produce the Frye Safari, a four-engine, Short Takeoff & Landing (STOL) airlifter, if Frye could find financing. Ernst Zindel, who designed the Junkers Ju 52, was retained as an assistant. However, the project was cancelled.

== Death and honors ==
On February 3, 1959, while driving home after a meeting with Howard Hughes in Tucson Arizona to finalize plans on the development of Frye's new aircraft: A STOL and Safari heavy transport plane, Frye in his 1959 Ford Galaxy 500 was killed instantly in a car accident by a drunk driver who ran a stop sign. It was exactly 33 years to the day after his founding of Standard Air Lines. The death received limited coverage, due to the deaths of famous musicians Ritchie Valens, Buddy Holly, and The Big Bopper in a plane crash on the same day. He was originally buried in Tucson, but now rests in Wheeler, Texas.

Frye received the Presidential Medal of Merit from Harry Truman for wartime contributions as a civilian in December 1946 where Frye donated many TWA aircraft and personnel for the war effort. In 2006, Frye was inducted into the International Air & Space Hall of Fame at the San Diego Air & Space Museum. Frye was elected into the National Aviation Hall of Fame in 1992.

In Martin Scorsese's 2004 biopic of Howard Hughes, The Aviator, Frye was portrayed by actor Danny Huston.
