= Helen Fisher Frye =

American educator and civil rights activist (1918–2014)

- Born: June 24, 1918; Danville, Kentucky, U.S.
- Died: November 26, 2014 (aged 96)
- Occupations: Educator, civil rights activist
- Spouse: John Frye
- Parent(s): Lydia (or Lettie) Moran and George Fisher

Helen Fisher Frye (June 24, 1918 – November 26, 2014) was an American educator and churchwoman who was a local leader for civil rights in her hometown of Danville, Kentucky, serving as the president of the Danville chapter of the NAACP. She was the first African American to enroll at Centre College and the first African American woman to receive a Master of Arts in Library Science from the University of Kentucky in 1960.

== Early life ==
Helen Fisher was born George Fisher, a railroad worker, and Lydia Moran Fisher who worked in the home, raising her children and providing a laundry service as a source of extra income. Frye carried lessons from her home life throughout her work. Her mother was a particularly motivating figure. She promoted hope, teaching her children that education could provide better opportunities, despite harsh, unjust treatment in their segregated world. Lydia also motivated her children to stand firm for their beliefs, something Frye most certainly did in her later years. Frye attended a segregated school in Danville, Bate School. In her childhood years, she experienced discrimination among other children. Being forced off the sidewalk was an experience she learned to not only tolerate, but truly overcome. Instances like this helped her develop an attitude that those who put others down are the individuals to feel truly sorry for. "And my twin brother, uh, who finished high school in 1938, as I did, wanted to go to embalming school. Of course, there was no Negro embalming school in the state, but the Kentucky School of Embalming in Louisville. I don't know for how long they had done it, but they evaded the law by having an adjoining room, an adjacent room, for the Negro students right where they could be in full view. And they were told, now you come on in this classroom with everybody else, but ever anyone comes in here and we are knowledgeable it might be a person who will check to see if we were adhering to the law, all you do is say you came here in this room to ask a question and you were going back to your room."

Fisher was active in her church from a very early age.

== Education ==
Frye exceeded in seeking and providing herself with a good education. When many Kentucky institutions were continuing to abide by the Day Law (a piece of legislation promoting segregation in higher education), Frye pushed boundaries. Although both her parents had been given a mere sixth grade education, Frye was able to achieve academic success, receiving three degrees.

The first of these degrees was a Bachelor of Arts in Elementary Education. This degree was largely the result of a lifelong dream of teaching. She started summer school at Centre College in Danville but then began working in a Head Start program and did not return. She received her degree in 1942 from Kentucky State University. The Kentucky Day Law enforced segregated education and limited opportunities for higher education for African Americans in Kentucky. Frye went out of state to take classes at Indiana University in the summers and during the school year, once a week, she commuted to Jeffersonville, Indiana to the Extension and took classes. She completed her master's degree in secondary education in 1949 after two summers and one year of commuting.

In 1954 an extension class from the University of Kentucky was held at the Danville High School for teacher professional development. Frye attended two sessions of the class, and John Glenn, the superintendent at the time, notified her on behalf of the university that they had decided that the finding from Lyman T. Johnson's lawsuit that won blacks the right to attend the University of Kentucky graduate school did not extend to extension work. "The way he expressed it to me, that he felt that he could soften the shock by telling me himself rather than some of them telling me." She hired a lawyer but none of the other African American students would testify that they too had applied and were turned down due to race. In fact, all the Danville teachers both black and white had completed their applications all together. Frye remembered later that John E. Robinson, the succeeding superintendent a year or two later, "went to the University of Kentucky and told them that he wanted extension classes for all of his teachers or none of his teachers."

Frye was asked to take the principalship at Stanford, Kentucky (which she declined at the time), and she decided to take summer classes at Ohio State University to get her certification in school administration.

Her second master's degree came from the University of Kentucky in 1960. It took her four summers – one of which she lived on campus in Jewell Hall. She remembered that she was assigned "a little room back behind – I don't know whether it was the furnace or the hot water heater." She said that in class an instructor "would come down the row asking questions and when they would get to me, they would skip over me and ask the next person. ... I knew it wouldn't be a rose garden and I didn't complain. I just went right on and did my work." Fearing a final blow from the prejudiced nature of her instructors at the university, she avoided taking her oral exams to finish her degree. However, when she finally completed her exams "these very people who had skipped over me and so forth were hugging me, congratulating me. To me that was a lot of hypocrisy but I accepted it." Frye was the first African American woman to obtain the Master of Arts in Library Science degree from the University of Kentucky.

== Career ==
Frye began her teaching career in the year 1942 in rural Casey County. She taught middle school education. Her second job was in Boyle County, Kentucky. Although she was officially employed as a teacher in the segregated institutions, her actual job requirements exceeded teaching. She worked as a bus driver, janitor, and whatever was needed to keep the small rural schools running.

She eventually was able to secure a teaching position within the Danville school system. During her time working for the system, she was president of the education association. Despite segregation, she served as head of both the African American and integrated groups. "We knew that the Negro teachers were technically better qualified than the white teachers because more of them had graduate hours percentage wise than the white teachers. Of course, naturally, we knew at the high school, they had a much broader curriculum than we had, because we were limited to the bare basics. We had even gotten down to the point that we didn't even have a foreign language in the high school." After Brown v. Board of Education the superintendent Rector Newlin recommended that the entire system be integrated, but the board rejected that idea . "The first effort was volunteer at the high school level. If you wanted to go the Danville High School, you may. Otherwise, if you want to stay at Bate High School, you may. … Then, [later] they went to the lower level and took grades one, two, and maybe three and did it by grades."

== Civil rights activist ==
Frye was engaged in the Civil Rights Movement at its peak in Kentucky, and did not try to hide the fact. Although she got her share of negative response to her public activism, Frye remained vigilant. She organized Danville youth who attempted to integrate lunch counters. "I organized the young people who made efforts at sitting in at public lunch counters here in Danville and I was teaching at Bate School then. And I was called in and chastised for doing that, but I told them that that was part of my citizenship rights and my obligation as a Christian and I was not going to stop and then."

The church served as a foundation for Frye's motivation and action. She helped bring cross-denominational ministers from around Danville to form a human relations counsel. As she stated in an oral history interview in 2000, "I believe in the Fatherhood of God, the Brotherhood of Man, and I am an integrationist."

Amongst her most notable victories was her work in integrating artistic performances at Centre College. Centre held concerts with tickets designated for whites only. Frye worked to bring in the first African American Broadway star to perform at Centre. "Porgy and Bess," featuring Danville native R. Todd Duncan, was the college's first integrated performance. After the success of that performance, Centre opened all similar events to a newly broadened, integrated audience.

She was a successful leader in the movement. She was a longtime leader in the Danville NAACP, serving as its president from the 1950s to 1968, during a critical time in the movement. Her twin brother was secretary of the first chapter of the Danville NAACP started by Reverend Hodrich, a Methodist minister, but the chapter had dwindled away by World War II. After the war with the veterans returning home, the discrimination and segregation were felt even more keenly, and she helped re-organize the chapter. They met in the Baptist Church where she belonged and also in the Methodist Church. They organized committees on education, public facilities and political office. With her leadership and the organized efforts of the local NAACP, they spearheaded a campaign for the first African American since the 1920s to be elected to the city council. They integrated the public housing projects. "We had a sense of direction and we went about it legally. We did not go about it in a militant manner."

Activism was a practice continued throughout Frye's life. She worked with the Domestic Economy Club (a local black woman's club organized in 1898) and the Busy Sunshine Club (organized in the early twentieth century) and the Federation of Women's Clubs to restore and maintain an historic home in Danville. She retired from teaching at the end of May 1980. After her retirement from teaching, she was appointed by the mayor to serve on both the public housing commission and she was the first president of the Danville-Boyle County Human Rights Commission. She also served on the Kentucky African American Heritage Commission. In 2006 she was awarded the University of Kentucky's Lyman T. Johnson Award for her many years of service as a librarian, teacher and civil rights activist.

== Death ==
Fisher Frye died on November 26, 2014, at the age of 96.

== See also ==
- Berea College v. Kentucky
- NAACP in Kentucky

== Additional resources ==
- Fosl, Catherine; Tracy Elaine K'Meyer (2009). Freedom on the Border: An Oral History of the Civil Rights Movement in Kentucky. Lexington, KY: University of Kentucky. ISBN 978-0813139012.
- Burnside, Jacqueline J. (1988), "Philanthropists and Politicians: a Sociological Profile of Berea College, 1855-1908," Ph.D. dissertation, New Haven, CN: Yale University
- Burnside, Jacqueline. ""Day Law," Early History of Black Berea". Berea, KY: Berea College. Archived from the original on 2011-08-11.
- Mary, Meehan. "CONFERENCE: FIGHT FOR EQUALITY STARTED SMALL, CONTINUES TODAY CIVIL RIGHTS SYMPOSIUM LOOKS AT MOVEMENT'S HISTORY IN KENTUCKY." Lexington Herald-Leader, February 12, 2000.
- "Frye, Helen Fisher". Notable Kentucky African Americans Database, University of Kentucky Libraries.
- "Helen Fisher Frye, two interviews by Betsy Brinson (1999 and 2000)". Pass the Word: A project of the Kentucky Oral History Commission. Kentucky Historical Society. 2012. Archived from the original on 14 July 2014.
- "Interview with Helen Fisher Frye; interview by Erica N. Johnson". African American Alumni Oral History Project. Lexington, KY: Louie B. Nunn Center for Oral History, University of Kentucky Libraries. 14 July 2006. Archived from the original on 21 September 2015.
- "Civil Rights Movement in Kentucky Discussed on Campus". Danville, KY: Centre College. 24 January 2002. Archived from the original on 20 May 2013.
- Edwards, Brenda (4 August 2012). "Former Bate teachers honored". Danville, KY: The Advocate Messenger.
- Davis, John T. (13 February 2006). "Thomas Spragens, Centre 'giant,' dies". Central Kentucky News. Archived from the original on 4 March 2016.
