= Bill Moyers =

American journalist (1934–2025)

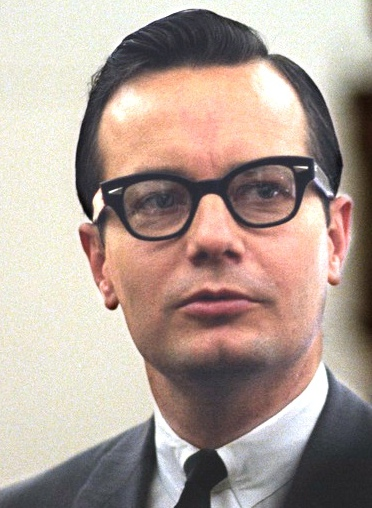
- Moyers in 1966

11th White House Press Secretary
- In office July 8, 1965 – February 1, 1967
- President: Lyndon B. Johnson
- Preceded by: George Reedy
- Succeeded by: George Christian

White House Chief of Staff
- De facto
- In office October 14, 1964 – July 8, 1965
- President: Lyndon B. Johnson
- Preceded by: Walter Jenkins (de facto)
- Succeeded by: Jack Valenti (de facto)

Personal details
- Born: Billy Don Moyers; June 5, 1934 Hugo, Oklahoma, U.S.
- Died: June 26, 2025 (aged 91) New York City, U.S.
- Party: Democratic
- Spouse: Judith Davidson (m. 1954)
- Children: 3
- Education: University of North Texas (attended); University of Texas, Austin (BA); University of Edinburgh (attended); Southwestern Baptist Theological Seminary (MDiv)

Billy Don Moyers (June 5, 1934 – June 26, 2025) was an American journalist and political commentator who served as the eleventh White House Press Secretary from 1965 to 1967 during the Lyndon B. Johnson administration. He also served as the de facto White House Chief of Staff for a brief period from 1964 until 1965.

Moyers was a director of the Council on Foreign Relations from 1967 to 1974. He was also a onetime steering committee member of the annual Bilderberg Meeting. Moyers also worked as a network TV news commentator for ten years. Moyers was extensively involved with public broadcasting, producing documentaries and news journal programs, and won many awards and honorary degrees for his investigative journalism and civic activities. He was well known as a trenchant critic of the corporately structured U.S. news media.

== Early life and education ==
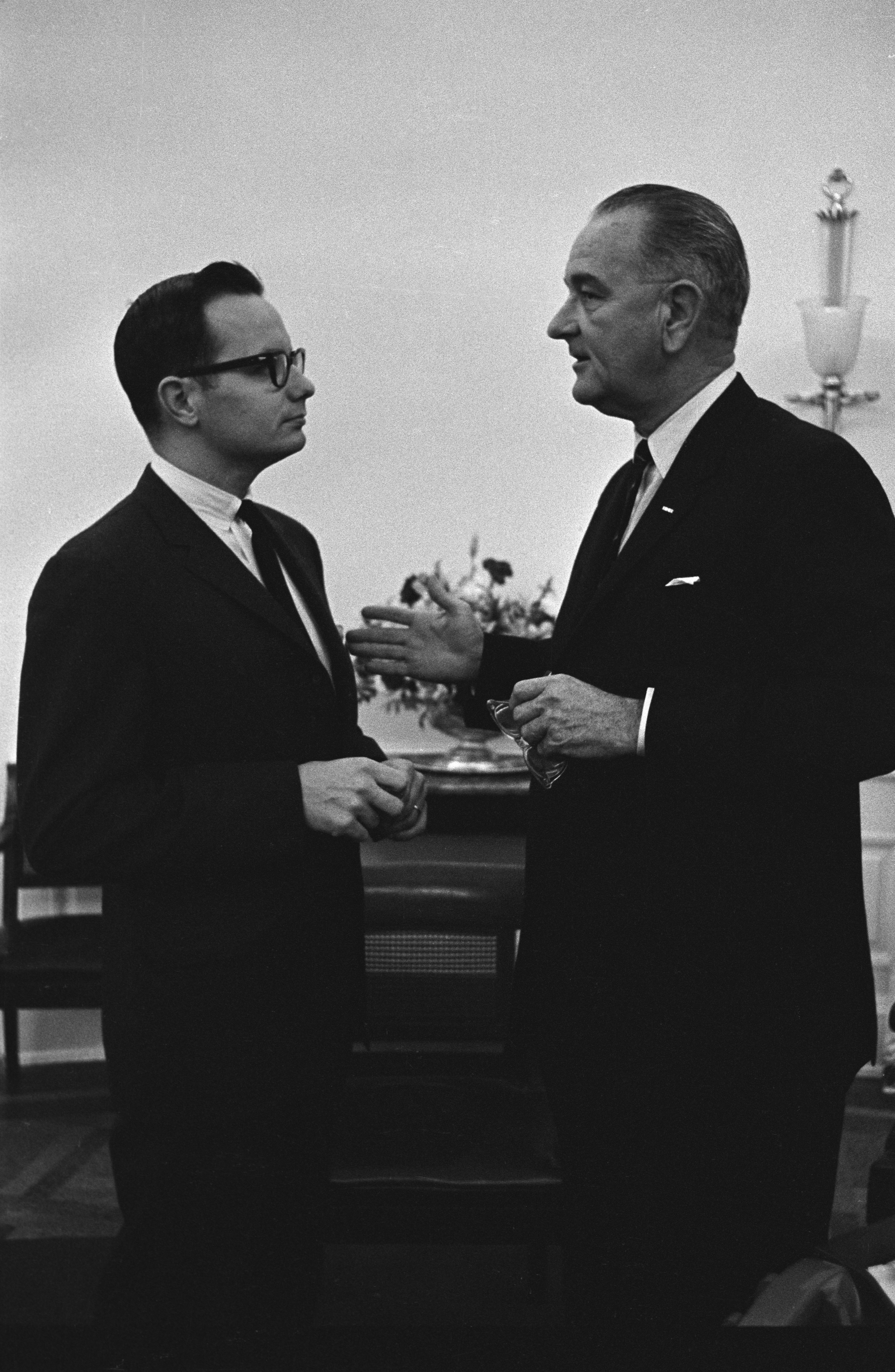
President Johnson (right) meets with special assistant Moyers in the White House Oval Office, 1963

Born Billy Don Moyers on June 5, 1934, in Hugo, Oklahoma, he was the son of John Henry Moyers, a laborer, and Ruby Johnson Moyers. Moyers was raised in Marshall, Texas.

Moyers began his journalism career at 16 as a cub reporter at the Marshall News Messenger. In college, he studied journalism at the North Texas State College in Denton, Texas. In 1954, U.S. Senator Lyndon B. Johnson employed him as a summer campaign intern and eventually promoted him to manage Johnson's personal mail. Soon after, Moyers transferred to the University of Texas at Austin, where he wrote for The Daily Texan newspaper. In 1956, he graduated with a Bachelor of Arts degree in journalism. While in Austin, Moyers served as assistant news editor for KTBC radio and television stations, owned by Lady Bird Johnson, Senator Johnson's wife. During the 1956–1957 academic year, he studied issues of church and state at the University of Edinburgh in Scotland as a Rotary International Fellow. In 1959, he completed a Master of Divinity degree at the Southwestern Baptist Theological Seminary in Fort Worth, Texas. Moyers served as Director of Information while attending SWBTS. He was also a Baptist pastor in Weir, Texas, near Austin.

Moyers planned to enter a Doctor of Philosophy program in American studies at the University of Texas. During Senator Johnson's unsuccessful bid for the 1960 Democratic U.S. presidential nomination, Moyers served as a top aide, and in the general campaign he acted as liaison between Democratic vice-presidential candidate Johnson and the Democratic presidential nominee, U.S. Senator John F. Kennedy.

== Kennedy and Johnson administrations ==
=== The Peace Corps ===
The Peace Corps was established by President Kennedy by Executive Order in March 1961, but it was up to top aide Sargent Shriver and Bill Moyers to find the funding to actually establish the organization. The Peace Corps Act was signed by President Kennedy on September 22, 1961. In Sarge, Scott Stossel reports that "Peace Corps legend has it that between them Moyers and Shriver personally called on every single member of Congress."

Reflecting 25 years later on the creation of the program Moyers said: ”We knew from the beginning that the Peace Corps was not an agency, program, or mission. Now we know—from those who lived and died for it—that it is a way of being in the world." At the 50th Anniversary “Salute to Peace Corps Giants”, hosted by the National Archives, Moyers said, "The years we spent at the Peace Corps were the best years of our lives.” Moyers gave the same answer in the famed Vanity Fair Proust questionnaire in 2011.

Moyers served first as associate director of public affairs and then as Sargent Shriver's deputy director before becoming special assistant to President Lyndon B. Johnson in November 1963.

=== Corporation for Public Broadcasting ===
Moyers was a key player in the creation of the public broadcasting system. In 1961, FCC Chairman Newton N. Minow labeled television "a vast wasteland” and called for programming in the public interest. Years later, the Johnson administration instituted a study of the issue. The Carnegie Corporation of New York established a commission to study the value of and need for noncommercial educational television. Moyers served on this committee, which released its report 'Public Television: A Program for Action' in 1967. Moyers said of the endeavor: “We became a central part of the American consciousness and a valuable institution within our culture."

Moyers was influential in creating the legislation that would fulfill the committee's recommendations. In 1967, President Johnson signed Public Broadcasting Act of 1967, which states: "it is in the public interest to encourage the growth and development of public radio and television broadcasting, including the use of such media for instructional, educational, and cultural purposes."

On the 50th anniversary of the Public Broadcasting Act, Moyers and Joseph A. Califano, Jr. spoke about their experience with WNET.

=== The Kennedy Assassination ===
In November 1963, Kennedy noted that Bill Moyers would be knowledgeable of the political climate in Dallas, Texas. He appointed Moyers to be the planner for his trip to the conservative and potentially hostile city. Bill had great difficulty with the assignment due to his lack of experience with the Dallas political climate; his presence was not wanted by the political elite, as he was an outsider more aligned to Austin than Dallas.

Two others had attempted to liaise with the Dallas political group that planned the arrangements for the trip with similar results. But with time running short, Moyers knew someone in Dallas who could work for the Kennedy advance team; someone who had been instrumental in the Peace Corps over the last few years and had married the Dallas clothing store mogul, Leon Harris, Jr. This person was Betty Harris. She had experience in writing and news media production.

Harris testified to the United States House Select Committee on Assassinations in a closed deposition of the preparations, phone calls, and arguments she had establishing the route that the Kennedy motorcade would take through Dallas. She was on the phone with Moyers "every two hours ... for those seven days" as the planning and infighting went on.

Moyers in Washington and Harris in Dallas made several decisions about the motorcade: the choice of the route to the Trade Mart through Downtown and Dealey Plaza, the publication of the route map one to two days before the event, the assignment of cars and seating positions, and the removal of the bubble top on the limousine. Their wishes were frequently at odds with Texas Governor John Connally, who also rode in the Kennedys' limousine, and the pro-Connally operatives Sam Bloom (the PR mouthpiece for the Dallas businessmen) and Bob Strauss.

=== Johnson Administration ===
When Lyndon B. Johnson took office after the Kennedy assassination, Moyers became a special assistant to Johnson, serving from 1963 to 1967. Moyers was the last surviving person identifiable in the photograph taken of Johnson's swearing in. He played a key role in organizing and supervising the 1964 Great Society legislative task forces and was a principal architect of Johnson's 1964 presidential campaign. Moyers acted as the President's informal chief of staff from October 1964 until July 1965. From July 1965 to February 1967, he also served as White House press secretary.

After the resignation of White House Chief of Staff Walter Jenkins because of a sexual misdemeanor in the run up to the 1964 election, President Lyndon B. Johnson, alarmed that the opposition was framing the issue as a security breach, ordered Moyers to request FBI name checks on 15 members of Barry Goldwater's staff to find "derogatory" material on their personal lives. Goldwater himself only referred to the Jenkins incident off the record. The Church Committee stated in 1975 that "Moyers has publicly recounted his role in the incident, and his account is confirmed by FBI documents." In 2005, Laurence Silberman wrote that Moyers denied writing the memo in a 1975 phone call, telling him the FBI had fabricated it. Moyers said he had a different recollection of the telephone conversation.

Moyers also sought information from the FBI on the sexual preferences of White House staff members, most notably Jack Valenti. Moyers indicated his memory was unclear on why Johnson directed him to request such information, "but that he may have been simply looking for details of allegations first brought to the president by Hoover."

Under the direction of President Johnson, Moyers gave J Edgar Hoover the go-ahead to discredit Martin Luther King, played a part in the wiretapping of King, discouraged the American embassy in Oslo from assisting King on his Nobel Peace Prize trip, and worked to prevent King from challenging the all-white Mississippi delegation to the 1964 Democratic National Convention.

Moyers approved (but had nothing to do with the production) of the infamous "Daisy Ad" against Barry Goldwater in the 1964 presidential campaign. Goldwater blamed him for it, and once said of Moyers, "Every time I see him, I get sick to my stomach and want to throw up." The advertisement is considered the starting point of the modern-day harshly negative campaign ad.

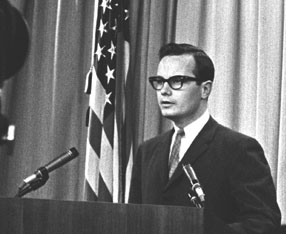
Moyers giving a press conference at the White House in 1965

Journalist Morley Safer in his 1990 book Flashbacks wrote that Moyers and President Johnson met with and "harangued" Safer's boss, CBS president Frank Stanton, about Safer's coverage of the U.S. Marines torching Cam Ne village in the Vietnam War. During the meeting, Safer alleges, Johnson threatened to expose Safer's "communist ties". This was a bluff, according to Safer. Safer says that Moyers was "if not a key player, certainly a key bystander" in the incident. Moyers stated that his hard-hitting coverage of conservative presidents Ronald Reagan and George H. W. Bush was behind Safer's 1990 allegations.

In The New York Times on April 3, 1966, Moyers offered this insight on his stint as press secretary to President Johnson: "I work for him despite his faults and he lets me work for him despite my deficiencies."

On May 18, 1966, Secretary of Defense Robert McNamara gave a speech in Montreal before the American Society of Newspaper Editors entitled Security in the Contemporary World, in which he criticized many aspects of U.S. defense policy. Lyndon Johnson was reportedly furious with McNamara's speech, and the discovery that Moyers had cleared it was a factor in Moyer's early departure.

On October 17, 1967, Moyers told an audience in Cambridge that Johnson saw the war in Vietnam as his major legacy and, as a result, was insisting on victory at all costs, even in the face of public opposition. Moyers felt such a continuation of the conflict would tear the country apart. "I never thought the situation could arise when I would wish for the defeat of LBJ, and that makes my current state of mind all the more painful to me," he told them. "I would have to say now: It would depend on who his opponent is."

The full details of his rift with Johnson were not made public. However, an Oval Office tape which was recorded following Johnson's public announcement that he would not seek re-election on March 31, 1968, suggested that Moyers and Johnson were still in contact after Moyers left the White House, with Moyers even encouraging the President to change his mind about running.

== Journalism ==
=== Newsday ===
Moyers served as publisher for the Long Island, New York, daily newspaper Newsday from 1967 to 1970. The conservative publication had been unsuccessful, but Moyers led the paper in a progressive direction, bringing in leading writers such as Pete Hamill, Daniel Patrick Moynihan, and Saul Bellow, and adding new features and more investigative reporting and analysis. Circulation increased and the publication won 33 major journalism awards, including two Pulitzer Prizes. But the owner of the paper, Harry Guggenheim, a conservative, was disappointed by the liberal drift of the newspaper under Moyers, criticizing the "left-wing" coverage of Vietnam War protests. The two split over the 1968 presidential election, with Guggenheim signing an editorial supporting Richard Nixon, when Moyers supported Hubert Humphrey. Guggenheim sold his majority share to the then-conservative Times-Mirror Company over the attempt of newspaper employees to block the sale, even though Moyers offered $10 million more than the Times-Mirror purchase price; Moyers resigned a few days later.

=== CBS News ===
In 1976, Moyers joined CBS News, where he worked as editor and chief correspondent for CBS Reports until 1981, then as senior news analyst and commentator for the CBS Evening News with Dan Rather from 1981 to 1986. He was the last regular commentator for the network broadcast. During his last year at CBS, Moyers made public statements about declining news standards at the network and declined to renew his contract with CBS, citing commitments with PBS.

=== NBC News ===
Moyers briefly joined NBC News in 1995 as a senior analyst and commentator, and the following year he became the first host of sister cable network MSNBC's Insight program. He was the last regular commentator on the NBC Nightly News.

=== PBS ===
==== Bill Moyers Journal (1972–1981) ====
In 1971, Moyers began working for the Public Broadcasting Service (PBS). His first PBS series, titled This Week with Bill Moyers, aired in 1971 and 1972.

Bill Moyers Journal ran on PBS from 1972 until 1981 with a hiatus from 1976 to 1977. He later hosted a show with this title from 2007 to 2010.

In 1975, Bill Moyers Journal aired Rosedale: The Way It Is, documenting the furor that arose after the first black family moved into Rosedale, Queens, including a rash of firebombings. In 2020, a graduate student drew attention to a short segment that had recorded the reactions of a group of black girls who attempted to make sense of the incident they had experienced. The New York Times later found the children and others featured in the documentary and produced its own reported feature: "A Racist Attack on Children Was Taped in 1975. We Found Them."

==== Individual programs (1982–2006) ====
From 1982 through 2006, 70 different documentaries, interviews or limited series produced and hosted by Moyers ran on PBS stations.

These were often produced by Moyers and his wife, Judith Suzanne Davidson Moyers, through Public Affairs Television, a company they formed in 1986. Other collaborators included filmmaker David Grubin and producer Madeline Amgott.

==== Frontline (1990–1999) ====
Between 1990 and 1999, Moyers produced and hosted 7 episodes of the PBS journalism program Frontline:

- Global Dumping Ground (1990) on toxic waste
- Springfield Goes to War (1990) on the debate around the Gulf War
- High Crimes and Misdemeanors (1990) on the Iran–Contra affair
- In Our Children's Food (1993) on pesticides
- Living on the Edge (1995) on the economy
- Washington's Other Scandal (1998) on campaign finance
- Justice for Sale (1999) on judicial elections

==== NOW with Bill Moyers and Wide Angle (2002–2005) ====
Moyers hosted the TV news journal NOW with Bill Moyers on PBS for three years, starting in January 2002. He retired from the program on December 17, 2004, but returned to PBS soon after to host Wide Angle in 2005. When he left NOW, he announced that he wished to finish writing a biography of Lyndon B. Johnson.

==== Bill Moyers Journal (2007–2010) ====
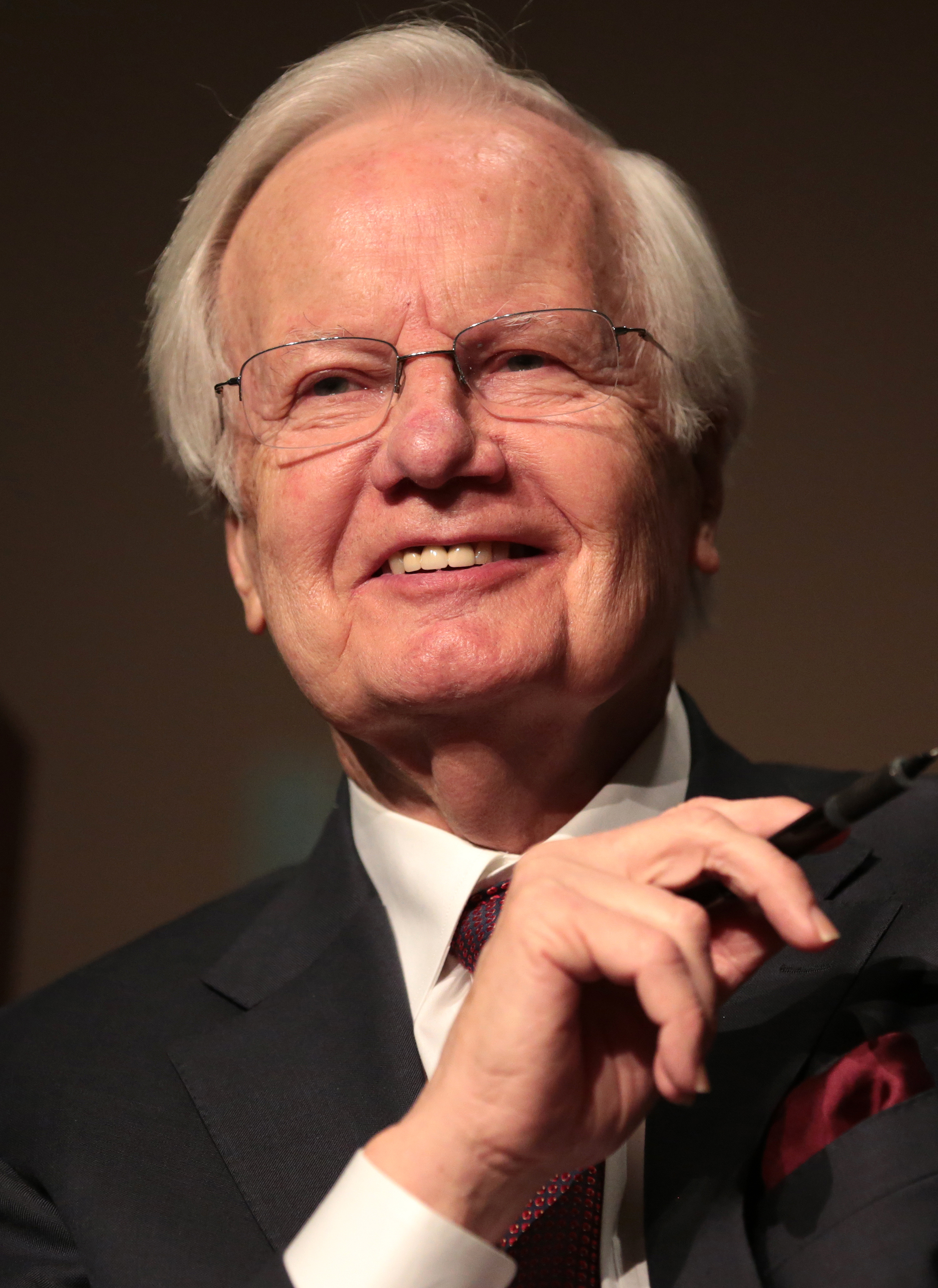
Moyers in 2017

On April 25, 2007, Moyers returned to PBS with Bill Moyers Journal. In the first episode, "Buying the War", Moyers investigated what he called the general media's shortcomings in the runup to the War in Iraq. "Buying the War" won an Emmy at the 29th Annual News & Documentary Emmy Awards (2008) for Best Report in a News Magazine.

On November 20, 2009, Moyers announced that he would be retiring from his weekly show on April 30, 2010.

==== Moyers & Company (2012–2015) ====
In August 2011, Moyers announced a new hour-long weekly interview show, Moyers & Company, which premiered in January 2012. In that same month, Moyers also launched BillMoyers.com. Later reduced to a half hour, Moyers & Company was produced by Public Affairs Television and distributed by American Public Television. The show has been heralded as a renewed fulfillment of public media's stated mission to air news and views unrepresented or underrepresented in commercial media.

The program concluded on January 2, 2015.

==== Frontline (2024) ====
In 2024 Frontline aired an episode created by Moyers entitled Two American Families: 1991-2024, which had been filmed over 34 years. The documentary followed two families from Milwaukee, struggling to survive in changing economies.

=== Moyers on Democracy podcast ===
In 2020, Moyers started a series of podcasts named Moyers on Democracy. Conversations included Lisa Graves on the Post Office conflict; Heather Cox Richardson on How the South Won the Civil War; Heather McGhee on racism's pernicious effect on American society and Bill T. Jones on his newest project — a retelling of Moby Dick from the viewpoint of a Black cabin boy. The series ended in early 2021.

=== Awards ===
In 1995, Bill Moyers was inducted into the Television Hall of Fame. The same year, he also won the Walter Cronkite Award for Excellence in Journalism. When he became a recipient of the 2006 Lifetime Emmy Award, the official announcement noted that “Bill Moyers has devoted his lifetime to the exploration of the major issues and ideas of our time and our country, giving television viewers an informed perspective on political and societal concerns," and that "The scope of and quality of his broadcasts have been honored time and again. It is fitting that the National Academy of Television Arts and Sciences honor him with our highest honor—the Lifetime Achievement Award." He had received twenty-six Emmy nominations, thirteen wins, and virtually every other major television journalism prize, including a gold baton from the Alfred I. duPont-Columbia University Awards, a Peabody Award and a George Polk Career Award (his third George Polk Award) for contributions to journalistic integrity and investigative reporting. He is a member of the American Academy of Arts and Letters, the American Philosophical Society, and has been the recipient of numerous honorary degrees, including a doctorate from the American Film Institute. In 2011, Moyers received the honorary Doctor of Humane Letters (L.H.D.) from Whittier College.

== Media criticism ==
In a 2003 interview with BuzzFlash.com, Moyers said, "The corporate right and the political right declared class warfare on working people a quarter of a century ago and they've won." He noted, "The rich are getting richer, which arguably wouldn't matter if the rising tide lifted all boats." Instead, however, "[t]he inequality gap is the widest it's been since 1929; the middle class is besieged and the working poor are barely keeping their heads above water." He added that as "the corporate and governing elites are helping themselves to the spoils of victory," access to political power has become "who gets what and who pays for it."

Meanwhile, the public has failed to react because it is, in his words, "distracted by the media circus and news has been neutered or politicized for partisan purposes." In support of this, he referred to "the paradox of Rush Limbaugh, ensconced in a Palm Beach mansion massaging the resentments across the country of white-knuckled wage earners, who are barely making ends meet in no small part because of the corporate and ideological forces for whom Rush has been a hero. ... As Eric Alterman reports in his recent book—a book that I'm proud to have helped make happen—part of the red-meat strategy is to attack mainstream media relentlessly, knowing that if the press is effectively intimidated, either by the accusation of liberal bias or by a reporter's own mistaken belief in the charge's validity, the institutions that conservatives revere—corporate America, the military, organized religion, and their own ideological bastions of influence—will be able to escape scrutiny and increase their influence over American public life with relatively no challenge."

When he briefly retired in December 2004, the AP News Service quoted Moyers as saying, "I'm going out telling the story that I think is the biggest story of our time: how the right-wing media has become a partisan propaganda arm of the Republican National Committee. We have an ideological press that's interested in the election of Republicans, and a mainstream press that's interested in the bottom line. Therefore, we don't have a vigilant, independent press whose interest is the American people."

== Presidential draft initiative ==
On July 24, 2006, liberal political commentator Molly Ivins published an article entitled Run Bill Moyers for President, Seriously, urging a symbolic candidacy, on the progressive website Truthdig. The call was taken up in October 2006 by Ralph Nader. Moyers did not run.

== Conflict with CPB over content ==
In 2003, Corporation for Public Broadcasting chairman Kenneth Tomlinson wrote to Pat Mitchell, the president of PBS, that NOW with Bill Moyers "does not contain anything approaching the balance the law requires for public broadcasting." In 2005, Tomlinson commissioned a study of the show, without informing or getting authorization from the CPB board. The study was conducted by Fred Mann, Tomlinson's choice, a 20-year veteran of the American Conservative Union and a conservative columnist. Like the study itself, Mann's appointment was not disclosed to the CPB.

Tomlinson said that the study supported what he characterized as "the image of the left-wing bias of NOW". George Neumayr, the executive editor of The American Spectator, a conservative magazine, told the NewsHour with Jim Lehrer that "PBS looks like a liberal monopoly to me, and Bill Moyers is Exhibit A of that very strident, left-wing bias... [Moyers] uses his show as a platform from which to attack conservatives and Republicans."

The Reporters Committee on the Freedom of the Press was vocal about the danger of the CPB chairman interfering with programming independence. The PBS Ombudsman and the Free Press noted that a poll taken in 2003 by the CPB itself found that 80 percent of Americans believe PBS to be "fair and balanced." In a speech given to The National Conference for Media Reform, Moyers said that he had repeatedly invited Tomlinson to have a televised conversation with him on the subject but had been ignored.

On November 3, 2005, Tomlinson resigned from the board, prompted by a report of his tenure by the CPB Inspector General Kenneth Konz, requested by Democrats in the U.S. House of Representatives. The report, which found that Tomlinson violated the Director's Code of Ethics and the statutory provisions of the CPB and PBS, was made public on November 15. It states:

We found evidence that the Corporation for Public Broadcasting (CPB) former Chairman violated statutory provisions and the Director's Code of Ethics by dealing directly with one of the creators of a new public affairs program during negotiations with the Public Broadcasting Service (PBS) and the CPB over creating the show. Our review also found evidence that suggests "political tests" were a major criteria [sic] used by the former Chairman in recruiting a President/Chief Executive Officer (CEO) for CPB, which violated statutory prohibitions against such practices.

In 2006, the PBS Ombudsman, whose role was reinvigorated by the controversy published a column entitled "He's Back: Moyers, not Tomlinson." Reflecting on the conflict, Moyers told The Boston Globe: "It's a place where if you fight you can survive, but it's not easy. The fact of the matter is that Kenneth Tomlinson had a chilling effect down the line."

== Organizations ==
Moyers was a onetime director of the Council on Foreign Relations (1967–1974), a onetime steering committee member of the Bilderberg Group, and from 1990 was president of the Schumann Center for Media and Democracy.

== Personal life ==
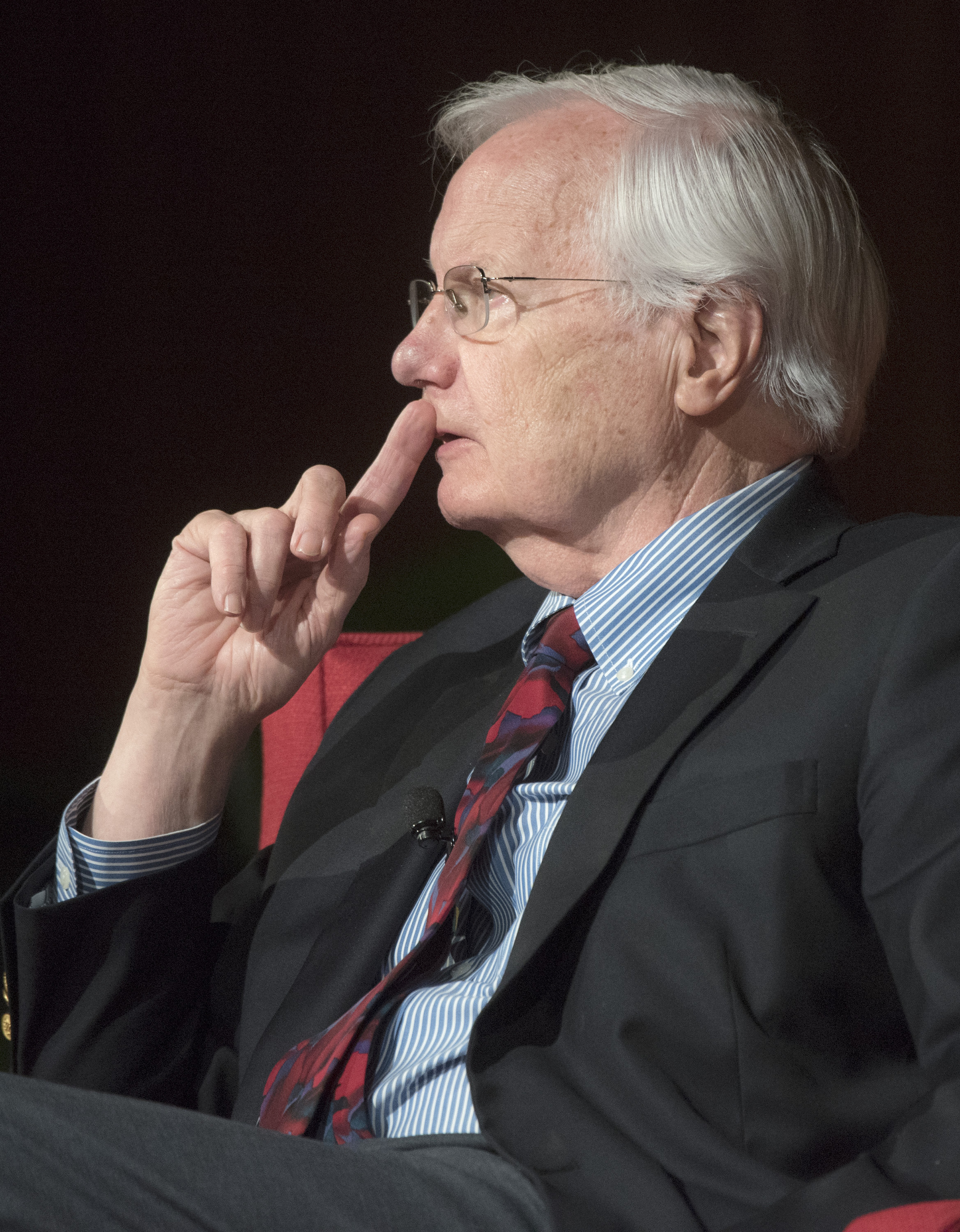
Moyers at the LBJ Presidential Library in 2018

Moyers married Judith Suzanne Davidson (a producer) on December 18, 1954. They had three children and five grandchildren.

His daughter, Suzanne Moyers, a former teacher and editor, is the author of the historical novel, ‘Til All These Things Be Done.

His son William Cope Moyers (CNN producer, Hazelden Foundation spokesman for addiction recovery) struggled to overcome alcoholism and crack addiction as detailed in the book Broken: My Story of Addiction and Redemption. He included letters from Bill Moyers in his book, which he said are "a testament to a father's love for his son, a father's confusion with his son, and ultimately, a father's satisfaction with his son". Later, he struggled with prescription opioid addiction and his use of both Suboxone medication and traditional addiction recovery methods such as prayer and twelve-step meetings, as he described in a second book, Broken Open: What Painkillers Taught Me About Life and Recovery.

His other son, John Moyers, assisted in the foundation of TomPaine.com, "an online public affairs journal of progressive analysis and commentary".

Moyers lived in Bernardsville, New Jersey, from 2003 to 2016.

=== Death ===
On June 26, 2025, Moyers died from complications relating to prostate cancer at a hospital in New York City. He was 91.

On news of his death, Press Watch editor Dan Froomkin called Moyers "one of the greatest of the greats." The Nation's John Nichols commented that "the modern media reform movement —with its commitment to diversity, to equity, and to defending the sort of speak-truth-to-power reporting that exposes injustice, inequality, authoritarianism, and militarism— was made possible by Bill's courageous advocacy during the Bush-Cheney years. He raised the banner and we rallied around it." Senator Bernie Sanders stated that "a friend, public servant, and outstanding journalist, has passed away. As an aide to President Johnson, Bill pushed the presidency in a more progressive direction. As a journalist, he had the courage to explore issues that many ignored."

== Published works ==
- Listening to America: A Traveler Rediscovers His Country (1971), Harper's Magazine Press, ISBN 0-06-126400-8
- The Secret Government: The Constitution in Crisis: With Excerpts from an Essay on Watergate (1988), coauthor Henry Steele Commager, Seven Locks Press, hardcover: ISBN 0-932020-61-5, 1990 reprint: ISBN 0-932020-85-2, 2000 paperback: ISBN 0-932020-60-7; examines the Iran-Contra affair
- The Power of Myth (1988), host: Bill Moyers, author: Joseph Campbell, Doubleday, ISBN 0-385-24773-7
- A World of Ideas: Conversations with Thoughtful Men and Women About American Life Today and the Ideas Shaping Our Future (1989), Doubleday, hardcover: ISBN 0-385-26278-7, paperback: ISBN 0-385-26346-5
- A World of Ideas II: Public Opinions from Private Citizens (1990), Doubleday, hardcover: ISBN 0-385-41664-4, paperback: ISBN 0-385-41665-2, 1994 Random House values edition: ISBN 0-517-11470-4
- Healing and the Mind (1993), Doubleday hardcover: ISBN 0-385-46870-9, 1995 paperback: ISBN 0-385-47687-6
- The Language of Life: A Festival of Poets (1995). Doubleday hardcover: ISBN 0-385-47917-4; 1996 paperback: ISBN 0-385-48410-0, conversations with 34 poets
- Genesis: A Living Conversation (1996), Doubleday hardcover: ISBN 0-385-48345-7, 1997 paperback: ISBN 0-385-49043-7
- Sister Wendy in Conversation with Bill Moyers: The Complete Conversation (1997), WGBH Educational Foundation, ISBN 1-57807-077-5
- Fooling with Words: A Celebration of Poets and Their Craft (1999), William Morrow, hardcover: ISBN 0-688-17346-2; 2000 Harper paperback: ISBN 0-688-17792-1
- Moyers on America: A Journalist and His Times (2004), New Press, ISBN 1-56584-892-6, 2005 Anchor paperback: ISBN 1-4000-9536-0; twenty selected speeches and commentaries, interview with Terri Gross on Fresh Air.
- Moyers on Democracy (2008), Doubleday, ISBN 978-0-385-52380-6
- Bill Moyers Journal: The Conversation Continues (2011), New Press

== See also ==
- Path to War

Political offices
Preceded by Walter Jenkins; De facto	White House Chief of Staff; De facto 1964–1965	Succeeded by Jack Valenti; De facto
Preceded by George Reedy	White House Press Secretary; 1965–1967	Succeeded by George Christian
Media offices
New office	Host of Now; 2002–2005	Succeeded by David Brancaccio
