= Ellen Miller =

Ellen Miller may refer to:

- Ellen Miller (artist), American painter, designer, author, and needleworker
- Ellen Miller (Lassie), a fictional character on the television series Lassie
- Ellen S. Miller, American political activist
- Ellen Miller (mountaineer), American high-altitude alpinist
- Ellen Sue Miller (1967–2008), American fiction writer
