= Schumann Center for Media and Democracy =

American media-analysis organization

The Schumann Center for Media and Democracy (formerly The Florence and John J. Schumann Jr. Foundation) was established in 1961, by Florence Ford and John J. Schumann Jr. The foundation states that its purpose is to renew the democratic process through cooperative acts of citizenship, especially as they apply to governance, and the environment. It is based in Montclair, New Jersey, in the New York City Metropolitan Area.

== Establishment ==
John J. Schumann Jr was the former president of General Motors Acceptance Corporation. Florence Ford brought to the foundation wealth that she had inherited from her father Austin Ford, who was one of the founders of Bundy Manufacturing Company, a predecessor of IBM.

Current officers and trustees of the foundation include the founders' sons Robert F. Schumann (chairman) and W. Ford Schumann (vice president) as well as Bill Moyers (president). Bill Moyers' son, John Moyers, was approved by the board of directors on Monday, October 9, 2006, to follow his father as president of the foundation when the senior Moyers retires in January 2007. About a month later, John Moyers resigned that position. Joan Konner, a long time board member, was appointed chairman of the board. John Moyers was the recipient of significant funds from the-then Schumann Foundation to found TomPaine.com, which he headed for several years.

== Statistics ==
The foundation reported 2001 assets of $60,963,043 and expenditures of $5,096,495. Recipients of recurring Schumann Foundation grants during the 1990s, ranging from under $100,000 to more than $5 million annually, include the Tides Foundation and Tides Center, Environmental Working Group, Union of Concerned Scientists, Natural Resources Defense Council, Western Organization of Resource Councils, Institute for Agriculture and Trade Policy, the Center for Media and Democracy, The Nation, Mother Jones, In These Times, TomPaine.com, and The American Prospect. The campaign finance reform advocacy organization, Public Campaign received over $1 million for its work in 2006.
