= Ellen S. Miller =

American open government activist

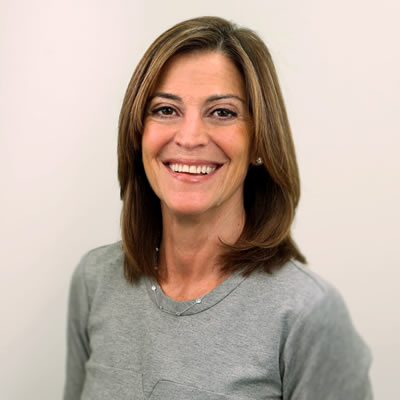
- Miller in 2013
- Education: Cedar Crest College; George Washington University
- Organization(s): OpenSecrets, TomPaine.com, Sunlight Foundation, Public Campaign
- Known for: Government transparency advocacy, OpenSecrets and Sunlight Foundation; Former publisher of TomPaine.com

Ellen S. Miller is an American political activist. A proponent of open government, she co-founded the Sunlight Foundation in 2006, serving as the group's executive director until her retirement in 2014. She sits on the board of directors of OpenSecrets, for which she was the founding executive director from 1984 to 1996. In 1996, she founded the Public Campaign. Miller has served as deputy director of the Campaign for America's Future, as a senior fellow at The American Prospect, and as publisher of TomPaine.com.

Prior to her work in the nonprofit sector, Miller held several staff-level positions in the United States government, working for the House Permanent Select Committee on Intelligence (1975), Senate Committee on Governmental Affairs (1976–1979), and the Senate Intelligence Committee (1980). Miller was included in Washingtonian Magazine's 100 Tech Titans (2009), Fast Company's The Most Influential Women in Technology (2009), and WIRED Magazine's 15 People The Next President Should Listen To (2008).

Miller is a graduate of Cedar Crest College and George Washington University.

== See also ==
- Sunlight Foundation
- Campaign for America's Future
- Public Campaign
