= Sunlight Foundation =

American nonprofit organization (2006–2020)

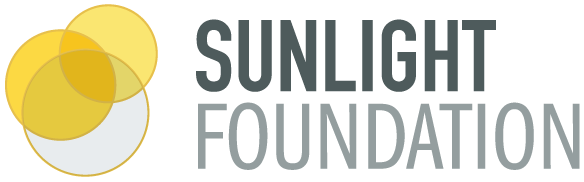
- Founded: April 2006
- Founder: Michael R. Klein, Ellen S. Miller
- Dissolved: September 2020
- Type: 501(c)(3)
- Tax ID no.: 20-3903427
- Registration no.: 253724
- Purpose: Government transparency, campaign finance reform
- Location: Washington, D.C., United States
- Executive Director: John Wonderlich
- Revenue: $495,097 (2017)
- Expenses: $1,451,359 (2017)
- Website: sunlightfoundation.com

The Sunlight Foundation was an American 501(c)(3) nonpartisan, nonprofit organization that advocated for open government. The organization was founded in April 2006 with the goal of increasing transparency and accountability in the United States Congress, the executive branch, and in state and local governments. The foundation's primary focus was the role of money in politics. The organization sought to increase campaign finance regulations and disclosure requirements. The Sunlight Foundation ceased operations in September 2020.

== Organizational overview ==
=== Founding ===
The Sunlight Foundation was founded by Ellen S. Miller and Michael R. Klein because of their concern about the influence of money in politics. The Foundation was launched in April 2006 with a $3.5 million contribution from co-founder Klein, a securities lawyer and the founder of CoStar Group.

At its founding, Sunlight's board was Klein, serving as chairman, Miller serving as secretary and treasurer, and Nicholas J. Klein, Klein's son.

Sunlight's original advisory board was Esther Dyson, Craig Newmark, and Kim Malone. Jimmy Wales, Yochai Benkler, Charles Lewis, Lawrence Lessig, Kim Scott, and Mitch Kapor later joined as advisors, with Newmark and Dyson moving to the board.

=== Personnel ===
Miller was the Sunlight Foundation's executive director from 2006 until her retirement in 2014. The first national director of the organization was law professor Zephyr Teachout. In September 2014, Christopher T. Gates was selected as the organization's new president, after the board conducted a search. Gates was formerly the chairman of the Colorado Democratic Party and executive director of Philanthropy for Active Civic Engagement and the National Civic League. In 2010, Matt Halprin of the Omidyar Network joined the board. In 2011, lawyer Andrew McLaughlin joined the board. In 2013, Stacey Donahue of the Omidyar Network joined, replacing Halprin. In 2014, Sunlight announced that Sue Gardner, Allison Fine, Mark Horvit and Daniel X. O'Neil would join its board of directors. Donahue subsequently left.

In January 2015, the Sunlight Foundation restructured, combining its reporting staff with its communications team. As a result of the restructuring, three staffers left the organization, including managing editor Kathy Kiely, who was laid off. In June 2015, four more staffers left the organization. Niko Klein and Gardner left the board. In January 2016, Klein announced on Sunlight's blog that the organization was looking for a new chief executive, with Gates leaving the organization and John Wonderlich serving as the interim executive director. In September 2016, Klein announced on Sunlight's blog that Sunlight Labs would be shutting down and the board would explore potential mergers. O'Neil subsequently left the board. Klein announced on Sunlight's blog on December 16 that the organization would remain independent, with Wonderlich becoming the permanent executive director and Alexander B. Howard promoted to be the deputy director. Fine, Horvit, McLaughlin, and Dyson all left the board.

In March 2018, Katherine Maher and Zoe Reiter joined Klein, Newmark and Wonderlich on the board.

=== Allegations of misconduct ===
In May 2018, the Huffington Post reported that Clay Johnson, former director of Sunlight Labs, had been accused of sexual misconduct and mistreatment by multiple women during his employment there. He quit after being given a warning after a reported incident. Subsequently, Sunlight's board announced that it would conduct a review of the organization's history. In February 2019, Sunlight's board announced the conclusion of the review, publishing a report which found significant problems that led to institutional failures.

=== Shutdown ===
In September 2020, co-founder Mike Klein announced that the Foundation would shut down. He wrote that the organization was no longer necessary because "Virtually all of the activities and staff of Sunlight have been transferred to other engaged institutions, or closed." Another open-government advocate suggested that a decline in donations was the ultimate cause.

=== Awards ===
In July 2009, the Sunlight Foundation received the Public Access to Government Information Award from the American Association of Law Libraries. In July 2010, the Sunlight Foundation won the grand prize of the Knight-Batten Awards for Innovations in Journalism for their Sunlight Live project that incorporates streaming video, live blogging, social networking, and data presentation.

=== Funding ===
The Sunlight Foundation's donors included the Open Society Foundations, The Pew Charitable Trusts, the John S. and James L. Knight Foundation, the Rockefeller Foundation, the Ford Foundation, the William and Flora Hewlett Foundation, the Omidyar Network, Bloomberg Philanthropies, and the Laura and John Arnold Foundation.

== Policy positions ==
The Sunlight Foundation advocated for more regulation and limitations regarding campaign finance. The organization opposed the ruling in Citizens United v. FEC, calling it "disastrous." The organization supported the DISCLOSE Act, a congressional bill that would have enacted stricter campaign finance regulations by requiring increased disclosure of political spending in federal elections. The Sunlight Foundation believed that Congress should mandate real-time online disclosure of political contributions. It opposed dark money, or funds given to nonprofit organizations that are not required to disclose their donors.

== Activities ==
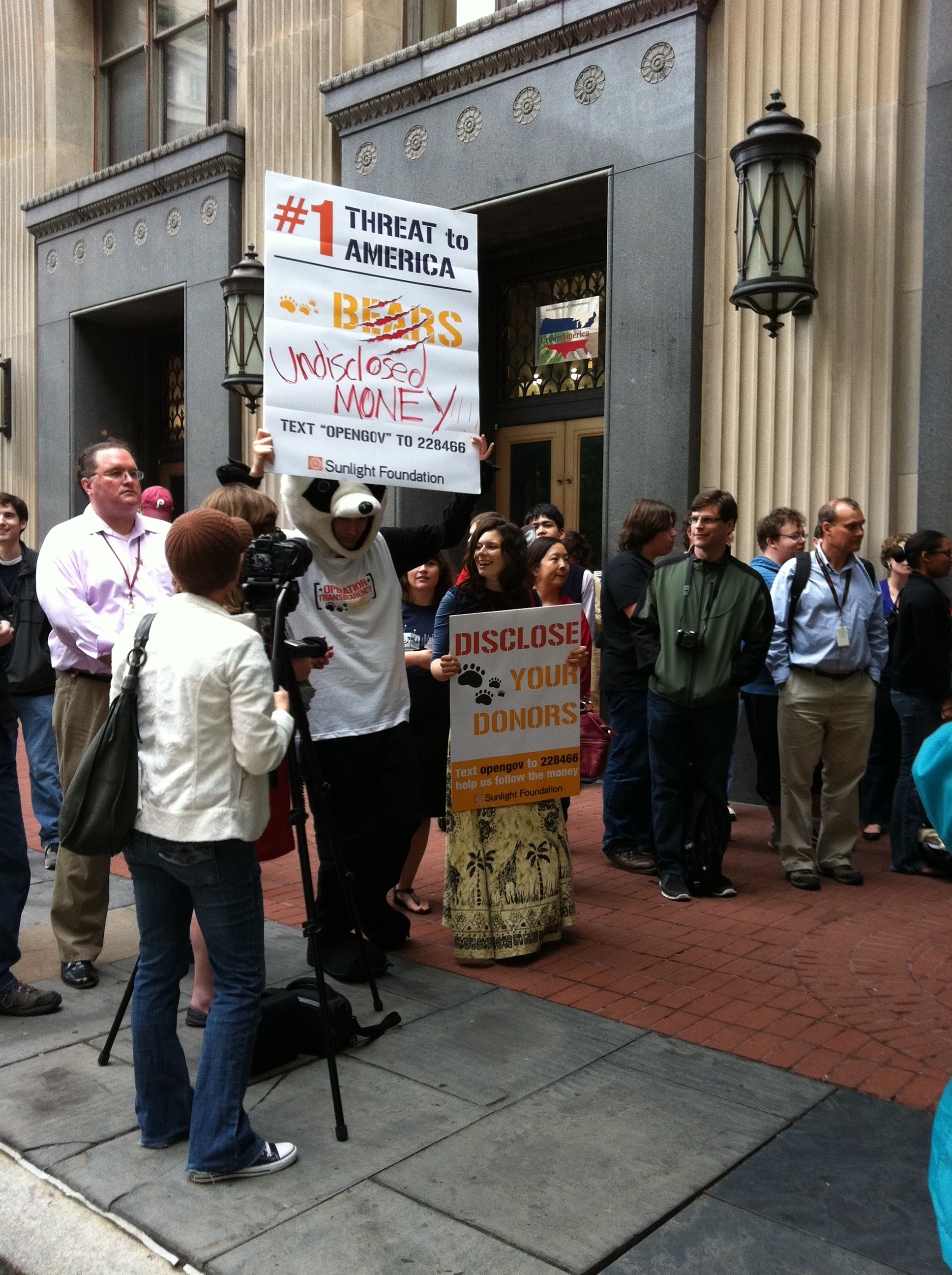
Demonstrators from the Sunlight Foundation outside Federal Election Commission offices as they discuss the application of Colbert Super PAC

The Sunlight Foundation's initiatives included investigative journalism, lobbying, activism and software development at Sunlight Labs, which was an open source community that collected and organized public data; Influence Explorer, which was an online tool for tracking money in politics; and Foreign Influence Explorer, which tracked lobbyists who represent foreign clients in Washington D.C.

In 2006, the Sunlight Foundation provided funding to OpenSecrets to improve its campaign finance and lobbying listings and to the Center for Media and Democracy to oversee a joint project called Congresspedia. In June 2006, the Sunlight Foundation reported on Republican House Speaker Dennis Hastert's real estate investments, accusing Hastert of not divulging connections between a $207 million earmark he won for a highway and an investment he and his wife made in nearby land.

=== Open House Project and OpenCongress.org ===
In January 2007, the Sunlight Foundation launched the Open House Project, a working group designed to make congressional procedures more transparent. In February 2007, the Participatory Politics Foundation and the Sunlight Foundation launched OpenCongress.org, a site to track the full text of legislation and build a community to better follow congressional activities. Originally run by the Participatory Politics Foundation with funding from the Sunlight Foundation, in 2013 the Sunlight Foundation overtook operations of OpenCongress.org. In 2016, Sunlight retired OpenCongress and directed its community to GovTrack.us amid its "explor[ation of] alliances with other organizations," with the idea of possibly "merging with one of them."

=== EarmarkWatch.org ===
In October 2007, the Sunlight Foundation joined Taxpayers for Common Sense to launch EarmarkWatch.org, a project that asked citizens to research over 3,000 earmarks and identify the sponsors and recipients. In 2008, the Sunlight Foundation launched a project called Public Markup. The project crowdsourced ideas for model transparency legislation.

=== Scout ===
Scout was a tool to create customized keyword alerts that notify users whenever the subscribed issue or bill is talked about in Congress, mentioned in the Federal Register or comes up in state legislation. During beta testing Scout helped a coalition of transparency advocates oppose and remove a FOIA exemption for a bill.

=== Call on Congress ===
Call on Congress was a toll free phone number individuals can call to learn about what Congress is doing. The project hopes to bridge the digital divide by letting callers find out how their representatives are voting on bills and raising campaign money or connect directly to the lawmakers’ Capitol Hill offices and get details on where to vote on Election Day.

=== Politwoops ===
Politwoops was a Sunlight Foundation project which published an archive of thousands of deleted tweets by U.S. politicians. The project prompted Rep. Jeff Miller to delete his Twitter account after his tweet questioning President Barack Obama's citizenship was made public. Other incidents covered by Politwoops include a number of Republican politicians reacting to incorrect news of the ruling in the Supreme Court's case about health care reform, violations of the social media policies of the House of Representatives' Congressional Handbook by tweeting campaign information and six politicians who deleted tweets praising and welcoming home Taliban prisoner Sgt. Bowe Bergdahl after questions arose over the prisoner swap that freed him. Time selected Politwoops as one of their 50 Best Websites of 2012, calling it "strangely fascinating."

Politwoops went on hiatus in May 2015 when Twitter, citing concerns over user privacy, revoked the Sunlight Foundation's permission to use its API In November 2015, Twitter CEO Jack Dorsey conceded that this had been a mistake, and Politwoops resumed international activity in January 2016 and American activity in February 2016. ProPublica now operates the U.S. version of the website.

=== Upwardly Mobile ===
In April 2012, the Sunlight Foundation released Upwardly Mobile, a web application to research where in the United States individuals could enjoy financial security and an improved quality of life. The relocation search tool was mostly powered by publicly available federal economic data that includes employment, salaries, average rents, and local medical and transportation costs.

=== Churnalism ===
The online Churnalism tool was launched in 2013 in collaboration with the Media Standards Trust as an open-source plagiarism detection engine. The tool allowed users to compare two sources of text to analyze similarities, but has been abandoned for lack of funding.

=== Ad Hawk ===
In 2012, the Sunlight Foundation launched a mobile application called "Ad Hawk" to identify political ads. Similar to many song identification services, Ad Hawk made an acoustic fingerprint based on audio recorded while a television or radio ad plays and compares it against a central database for a match. Ad Hawk would return information from a variety of sources about the candidate, organization and issues ads if a match is found.

=== Events and contests ===
In 2009, the Sunlight Foundation held the first annual TransparencyCamp, a conference where open government advocates met to discuss problems and solutions with government data.

In March 2010, the Sunlight Foundation announced the Design for America contest to encourage visualizations to make complex government information more understandable to citizens.

In August 2012, the Sunlight Foundation launched Sunlight Academy, an interactive training portal to help journalists, staffers, and citizens use transparency tools to research issues more effectively.

== See also ==
- Sunshine Week
- OpenSecrets
- Sunlight before signing
