= Christopher T. Gates =

American philanthropist

Christopher E. Gates
- Education: University of Colorado; Harvard University
- Occupation: Nonprofit executive
- Political party: Democratic

Christopher T. Gates is an American philanthropist and political activist. He is the former president of the Sunlight Foundation. He is the past Executive Director of Philanthropy for Active Civic Engagement (PACE). PACE is an affinity group of the Council on Foundations and works as a learning collaborative of funders who are working in the fields of civic engagement and democratic renewal. Gates served as President of the National Civic League until June 15, 2006. He was named President in 1995, previously serving as vice-president of the NCL.

Gates earned a master's degree in public administration from the John F. Kennedy School of Government at Harvard University. At Harvard, he studied the interaction between the public and private sectors. Gates also earned an honors degree in economics from the University of Colorado at Boulder. He also spent time as a student at the University of East Anglia in England, where he studied political economics.

In 2003, he was elected as the Chair of the Colorado Democratic Party. During his term as Party Chair, the Democrats saw success in Colorado, winning a U.S. Senate seat, an additional seat in the U.S. Congress and winning control of both of the houses of the state legislature.

Gates founded the Colorado Institute for Leadership Training, a statewide progressive leadership training program, in 1991 and continues to serve as its board chair.

On May 20, 2006, Gates received an honorary Doctor of Laws degree from Elizabethtown College, Pennsylvania.

Non-profit organization positions
Preceded by	President of the National Civic League; 1995 – June 15, 2006	Succeeded by Derek Okubo (interim)
Preceded by	Chair of the Colorado Democratic Party; 2004–2006	Succeeded by Pat Waak
First	Executive Director of Philanthropy for Active Civic Engagement; 2006 –	Incumbent
