= National Civic League =

American non-profit organization

- Predecessor: National Municipal League
- Formation: 1894
- Founded at: Philadelphia
- Website: www.nationalcivicleague.org

The National Civic League is an American nonpartisan, non-profit organization founded in 1894 as the "National Municipal League”; it adopted its new name in 1986. Its mission is to advance civic engagement to create equitable, thriving communities. To upgrade quality and efficiency of government in cities it enlists the business and professional classes, and promotes greater involvement in government. It also sought to create merit-based systems for selecting public officials. The League envisions a country where the full diversity of community members are actively and meaningfully engaged in local governance, including both decision making and implementation of activities to advance the common good. It also promotes professional management of local government through publication of "model charters" for both city and county governments.

The National Civic League applies civic engagement principles through key programs: community assistance, research and publications, and awards and events. Key issue areas include, but are not limited to: racial equity, environmental sustainability, health equity, youth leadership, education, and housing.

== History ==
The National Civic League was founded as the National Municipal League in 1894 at the National Conference for Good City Government in Philadelphia. The convention of politicians, policy-makers, journalists, and educators (including Theodore Roosevelt, Louis Brandeis, Marshall Field, and Frederick Law Olmsted) met to discuss "incompetence, inefficiency, patronage and corruption in local governments." During the next 120+ years, the National Civic League led major reforms in the way local communities were governed, including the professionalism of city services, the creation of the city manager system, the nonpartisan makeup of many local elected bodies, electoral reform, and inclusive civic engagement.

Timeline of important national civic league milestones
Year	Milestone
1895	Theodore Roosevelt, Louis Brandeis, Frederick Law Olmsted, Mary Mumford and other leading municipal reformers gathered in Philadelphia to discuss the future of city government.
1898	National Civic League developed the first "Municipal Plan" to give more power and autonomy to local officials, a city council with nonpartisan elections, and a hands-on mayor.
1900	Galveston, Texas was the first community to adopt the "city commission" form of government.
1910	The concept of employing a professional city manager for city departments was developed by Richard S. Childs. It was first implemented in Sumter, South Carolina.
1912	First issue of the National Municipal Review (later the National Civic Review) published.
1930	National Civic League acted as the premier civic engagement group researching, advocating, publishing and consulting on civic engagement applications like voter registration, election administration, state constitutions, etc.
1949	The All-America City contest was born. Based on the annual tradition of naming a team of All-American football players, the All-America City Award initially sought to recognize 11 outstanding communities, before settling on the current 10 per year.
1980	Began research, education and publications to advance civic infrastructure.
1990	National Civic League helps to spearhead the "civic renewal movement".
2000	Strengthened focus on issues, such as environment, racial equity, immigrant integration, transportation, fiscal sustainability.

== Events and programs ==
=== All-America City Award ===
The League is best known for its All-America City Award, celebrating the best in civic innovation since 1949. The Award, bestowed yearly on 10 communities recognizes the work of communities in using inclusive civic engagement to address critical issues and create stronger connections among residents, businesses and nonprofit and government leaders. Once called the "Nobel Prize for constructive citizenship" – it has been awarded to more than 500 communities across the country. The Award is open to all American communities, from major cities, counties and regions to tribes, neighborhoods, towns and villages. In applying, communities reflect on their strengths, weaknesses, challenges and the progress they have made. Each year hundreds of leaders, volunteers, and young people from the finalist communities travel to Denver to present the story of their work and their community to a jury of national experts. The awards conference includes workshops on promising practices.

=== National Conference on Local Governance ===
The National Civic League hosted the 109th National Conference on Local Governance in Denver on June 22, 2018. The Conference focused on inclusive civic engagement, innovation and collaboration as essential elements for making progress on complex issues. The conference featured three issue tracks: Health Equity, Youth and Education, Police-Community Relations.

Confirmed speakers included:

- Jandel Allen-Davis, MD: Kaiser Permanente, Vice President of Government and External Relations
- Honorable Fred Harris: Former U.S. Senator and member of President Johnson's Kerner Commission
- Manuel Pastor, PhD:Professor at University of Southern California and author
- Honorable Hilda L. Solis: Los Angeles County Supervisor, Former Congresswoman and Former U.S. Secretary of Labor
- Reverend Alvin Herring: Executive Director of Faith in Action

=== Community assistance ===
National Civic League facilitates strategic planning processes, community engagement trainings, and development of local engagement plans and materials—helping local governments and institutions engage and involve residents in ways that lead to tangible outcomes.

The National Civic League consults with communities in a variety of capacities, including:

- Resident-led strategic planning
- Lead local engagement trainings to increase institution's internal engagement capacity
- Partner with local communities to develop specific conversation guides, engagement plans and other relevant tools.
- Developing organizational and community-wide engagement plans
- Civic engagement coaching and support for local leaders

The League has provided, or is providing, community assistance to the following cities:

- Gladstone, Missouri
- Eau Claire, Wisconsin
- Dubuque, Iowa
- Castle Pines, Colorado
- Blue Springs, Missouri
- Ray Town, Missouri
- Palm Desert, California
- Lees Summit, Missouri

=== SolSmart ===
The National Civic League's focus on civic engagement and environmental sustainability led it to partner with the International City/County Management Association on SolSmart. SolSmart is funded by the U.S. Department of Energy SunShot Initiative and works to make it faster, cheaper and easier to go solar. The League works to support the designation program and to encourage communities to engage residents around solar and sustainability issues.

The SolSmart designation program recognizes communities that have taken steps to make it easier for businesses and residents to go solar. Communities pursuing SolSmart designation are eligible for no-cost technical assistance from a team of national solar experts. National Civic League is working to see 300 communities become designated and advocate for strong community engagement practices in creating and further local community solar goals.

=== Robert Wood Johnson Foundation Health Equity Award ===
Together with the Robert Wood Johnson Foundation, National Civic League is recognizing, celebrating and rewarding individuals who are making health equity a reality in their community. The RWJF-National Civic League Health Equity Award recognizes individuals who are leveraging engagement to improve health outcomes for those most impacted by health disparities.

The RWJF-National Civic League Health Equity Award recognizes and honors individuals that have successfully implemented a systems change approach within the past two years to improve health outcomes for those most impacted by health disparities. In addition to national recognition at the National Civic League's annual All-America City Award and an invitation to participate in Robert Wood Johnson Foundation's yearly Health Equity Award annual learning and recognition the winner will receive a $3,000.00 prize.

The 2018 Health Equity Award Winner was Angela Bannerman Ankoma and Sharon Conard Wells, of the Sankofa Initiative in Providence, RI. The Sankofa Community Initiative is a unique urban agricultural project integrating food production and economic development with high-quality, stable affordable housing for the sizable refugee and immigrant population of Providence, Rhode Island.

=== Truth, Racial Healing and Transformation ===
Due to the League's focus on civic engagement and racial equity, they have engaged with W.K. Kellogg Foundation's Truth, Racial Healing and Transformation (TRHT) initiative. Kellogg's TRHT is a comprehensive, national and community-based process to plan for, and bring about transformational and sustainable change, and to address the historic and contemporary effects of racism.

As a partner of the Kellogg Foundation, the National Civic League introduced the TRHT initiative to their All-America City network. The hope is to see communities face and embrace an accurate narrative of all residents' experiences, pursue healing where divisions exist and experience transformation that comes with addressing inequities. Using the TRHT framework, local communities can address segregated and impoverished neighborhoods, provide equitable opportunities in the economy and ensure fair treatment in public policies as well as civil and criminal law.

TRHT was launched in January 2016 with a year-long design phase, and builds upon and complements the foundation's decades-long commitment to advancing racial healing and racial equity throughout the U.S. In June 2017 WKKF awarded 10 grants for nearly $24 million over the next two to five years to help diverse, multi-sector coalitions in 14 places implement the foundation's TRHT process and framework.

=== All-America Conversations ===
The National Civic League has worked with communities across the U.S. to hold "All-America Conversations" across dividing lines and identify ways that we can work together. All-America Conversations are designed to help cities and other groups understand residents' aspirations for the community, the divisions facing the community, and most importantly, the small, specific actions that give people confidence that we can work across dividing lines.

The League created the All-America Conversations Toolkit to provide communities with everything necessary to hold a productive and meaningful conversation. The toolkit walks readers through every step of holding a conversation from:

- Identifying whom to engage and recruiting participants
- Picking a location for your conversation
- Finding and preparing facilitators and note takers
- Knowing what to ask
- Making sense of what you heard

The kit also includes tips for facilitators and note takers, a note-taking tool, ground rules, a sign-in sheet, sample recruitment letter, and many other resources.

== Resources ==
=== Healthy Democracy ===
In October 2024, the Healthy Democracy Map was launched which tracks and maps all the organizations in the United States working to improve democracy as well as showing links between groups that are members of coalitions. It is designed to help people who want to get involved in promoting and protecting democracy.

=== National Civic Review ===
One of the nation's oldest and most respected journals of civic affairs, the National Civic Review includes case studies, reports, interviews and essays to help communities learn about the latest developments in collaborative problems-solving, civic engagement, local government innovation and democratic governance. Some of the country's leading doers and thinkers have contributed articles to this invaluable resource for elected officials, public managers, nonprofit leaders, grassroots activists, and public administration scholars seeking to make America's communities more inclusive, participatory, innovative and successful.

=== Promising practices monthly webinars ===
Th League hosts a free monthly webinar series highlighting successful projects around the country with speakers from cities implementing creative strategies for civic engagement. By equipping individuals, institutions and local governmental bodies through this series with ideas, models and insights that can be adopted/adapted to individual communities National Civic League hopes to accelerate the pace of change in communities across the country. Webinar topics include:

- Building community trust using police data
- Community dialogues with On the Table
- Infusing engagement in city planning and visioning
- Infusing equity in city government
- Building equity in parks and recreation
- The power of libraries to foster inclusive civic engagement
- Racial equity and healing

=== Civic Index ===
For 30+ years, the Civic Index has been a way to measure a community's civic infrastructure—the formal and informal relationships, networks and capacities communities use to make decisions and solve problems. Building on decades of work in communities, the fourth edition updates the Civic Index with a specific focus on equity and engagement; key components for healthy, thriving communities.

=== Promising Practices Database ===
The database includes summaries of projects that leverage civic engagement from some of the 500 All-America Cities and other communities. Highlighted projects tackle how cities make progress on issues like health, racial equity, youth and education, housing and neighborhood development, sustainability and conservation, community-police relations and more.

=== Model City Charter ===
The Model City Charter serves as a "blueprint" for communities seeking to draft or revise their own home-rule charters. A city charter establishes the framework for how a municipal government operates—its structure, responsibilities, functions, and processes.

Currently in its eighth edition, the National Civic League's model calls for a small city council with deliberative powers to make decisions on policy and an appointed city manager to oversee day-to-day administrative matters. The model provides communities with detailed provisions for the conduct of local elections, the administration of budgets and duties of city officials and managers.

The Second Printing (2011), Eighth Edition of the Model City Charter expands diversity and inclusiveness language in the charter preamble to underscore the right of every individual to equal opportunities and establish policies to prohibit discrimination.

=== Community Visioning and Strategic Planning Handbook ===
Based on decades of hands-on experience by National Civic League staff, the Community Visioning and Strategic Planning Handbook (2000) aims to help communities convene diverse groups of stakeholders to envision and implement ambitious goals for the future with an inclusive process for planning and decision-making. The handbook also gives communities useful tips on action planning to implement the ambitious goals they have set for themselves.

=== Framework for a Financial Sustainability Index ===
A joint project of the National Civic League, the Government Finance Officers Association, the University of Southern California and the University of San Francisco, the Framework for a Financial Sustainability Index was developed with support from the Lincoln Institute of Land Policy. It provides a new set of tools and techniques to help local government leaders develop systems of governance and decision-making that will make their communities more financially sustainable. It addresses both technical concerns and the psychological and interpersonal aspects of financial governance that have a critical impact on how decisions are made.

=== Guide for Charter Commissions ===
A local charter is the foundation of a local government and functions as the municipal equivalent of a state or federal constitution, setting forth guiding principles for governance. Composed by citizens, a charter specifies the most fundamental relationships between a government and its community. This publication, from 2011, helps communities decide when and how to draft or review their home rule charters. It provides useful information on how to set up a charter review commission, who should serve on it and how to engage community members in the process.

=== Making Public Participation Legal ===
This publication helps city attorneys and other legal advisors make recommendations in an ever-changing context of public participation and democratic governance for which there are few clear laws or legal precedents.

Over the last two decades, a wide range of participatory meeting formats and dynamic online tools have emerged. So why do communities continue conducting public business in such an outdated fashion? One obstacle is the legal framework that governs public participation. At the local, state, and federal levels, these laws can stifle innovation and discourage public officials and employees from reaching out to citizens while failing to achieve the intended goal of greater transparency.

A working group of representatives from the International Municipal Lawyers' Association, International City/County Management Association, American Bar Association, National League of Cities, National Civic League, Policy Consensus Initiative, National Coalition for Dialogue and Deliberation, and Deliberative Democracy Consortium developed new set of legal tools for public participation, including:

- Model public participation ordinance for local governments
- Model public participation act for state governments
- Local policy options and techniques for strengthening public participation

=== Model Executive Orders for Equity ===
The National Civic League has researched executive orders and ordinances designed to improve equity and inclusiveness. Cities are encouraged to use these models to develop ordinances or other public policies. Model Executive Orders include:

- Diversity training for Board and Commission members
- Creation of chief diversity and inclusion officer
- Establishes public engagement and outreach principles
- Police accountability and racial justice
- Use "Rooney Rule" for city openings
- Use "returning citizen" instead of "ex-offender" in city efforts policy
- Executive order re: pay equity
- Proclamation about National Day of Racial Healing

== Officers ==
Presidents
Name	Term
James C. Carter	1894–1903
Charles J. Bonaparte	1903–1910
William D. Foulke	1910–1915
Lawson Purdy	1915–1919
Charles E. Hughes	1919–1921
Henry M. Waite	1921–1923
Frank L. Polk	1923–1927
Richard S. Childs	1927–1931
Murray Seasongood	1931–1934
Harold W. Dodds	1934–1937
Clarence A. Dykstra	1937–1940
John G. Winant	1940–1946
Charles Edison	1946–1950
Henry Bruère	19510–1953
George H. Gallup	1953–1956
Cecil Morgan	1956–1959
William Collins	1959–1962
Alfred E. Driscoll	1962–1970
William W. Scranton	1970–1972
Wilson W. Wyatt	1972–1975
Carl H. Pforzheimer	1975–1978
Robert H. Rawson	1978–1981
James L. Hetland Jr.	1981–1985
Terry Sanford	1985–1986
John Parr	1986–1995
Christopher T. Gates	1995–2006
Derek Okubo (interim)	2006–2006
Gloria Rubio-Cortés	2006–2015
Doug Linkhart	2015–Present

Chairs of the board
Name	Term
Terrell Blodgett	1987–1987
William F. Winter	1987–1988
Henry G. Cisneros	1988–1992
George Latimer	1992–1993
William F. Winter	1993–1994
John W. Gardner	1994–1996
Anna F. Jones (acting)	1996–1997
William W. Bradley	1997–1998
R. Scott Fosler	1998–2001
Dorothy S. Ridings	2001–2004
Robert Rawson Jr.	2004–2007
Elizabeth Hollander	2007–2008
Sandra W. Freedman	2008–2011
Elizabeth Hollander	2011–2013
Mayor Michael B. Hancock	2013–2015
Hon. David M. Sander, PhD	2015–2016
Derek Okubo	2016–2017
Hon. Steve Hogan	2017–2018
Valerie Lemmie	2018–Present

*NOTE: Overlapping years of service indicate that the position changed hands mid-year.

== See also ==
- League of California Cities, whose creation was inspired in part by the League.
