= All-America City Award =

Community recognition program in the United States given by the National Civic League

- Awarded for: Communities that leverage civic engagement, collaboration, inclusiveness, and innovation to successfully address local issues
- Location: Denver, Colorado
- Country: United States
- Presented by: National Civic League
- First award: 1949
- Website: nationalcivicleague.org

The All-America City Award is a community recognition program in the United States given by the National Civic League. The award recognizes the work of communities that use inclusive civic engagement to address critical issues and build stronger connections among residents, businesses, nonprofits, and government leaders.

== History ==
The award was established in 1949 by the National Civic League. The award was inspired by the National Collegiate Athletic Association (NCAA), which honored its best players each season with the All-America college football team designation. The award is open to all American communities, ranging from major cities and regions to towns, villages, counties, neighborhoods, and tribes. Communities submit a comprehensive package based on published criteria that are evaluated in the award selection process. Finalists are named from the applications, and then the year's ten award winners are named from that pool of applicants. Representatives from the finalist communities travel to Denver to present the story of their work and their community to a jury of national experts. The awards conference includes workshops.

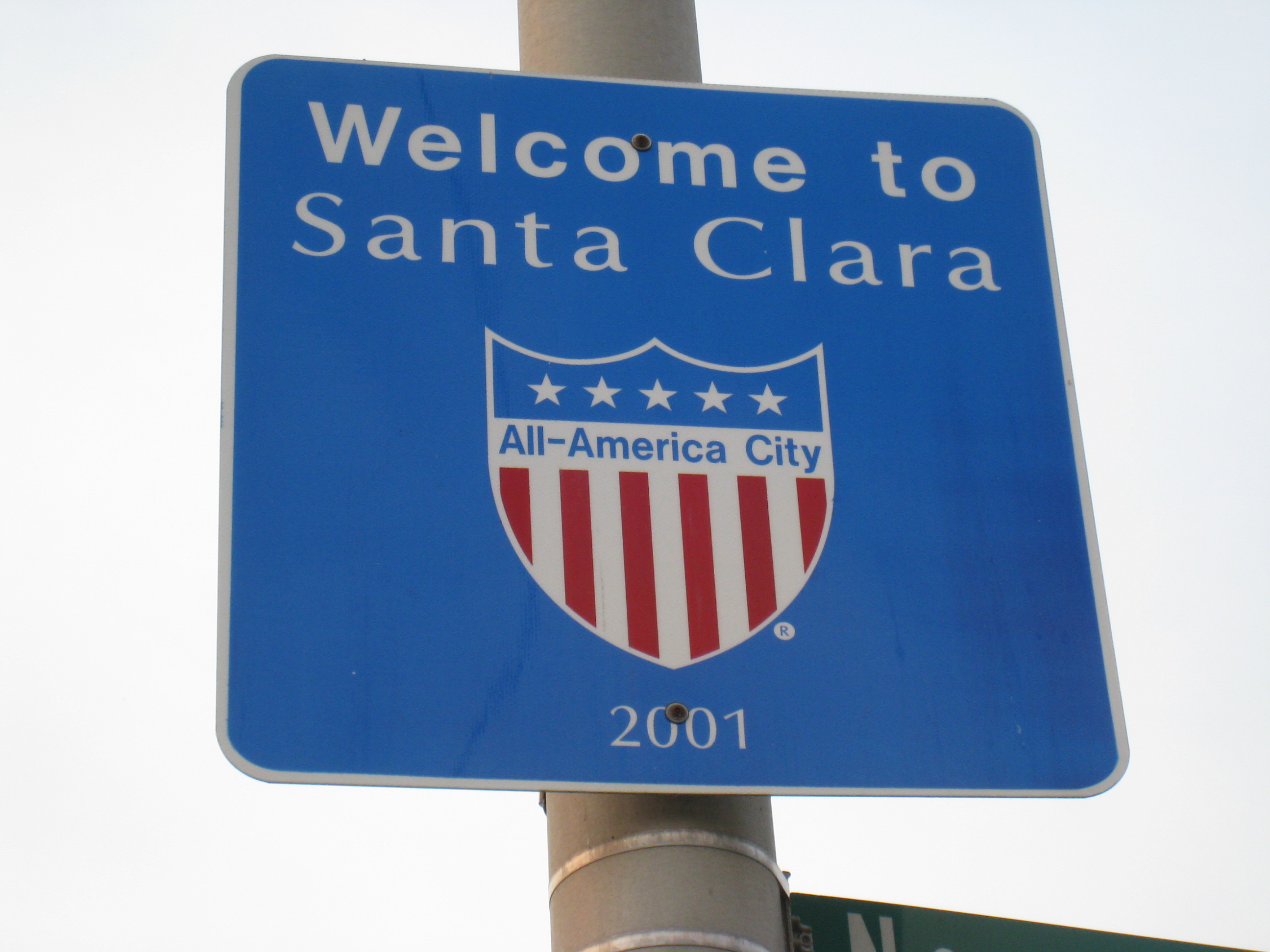
Welcome sign in Santa Clara, California, highlighting its award in 2001
