= Betty Ford's August 1975 60 Minutes interview =

American television interview

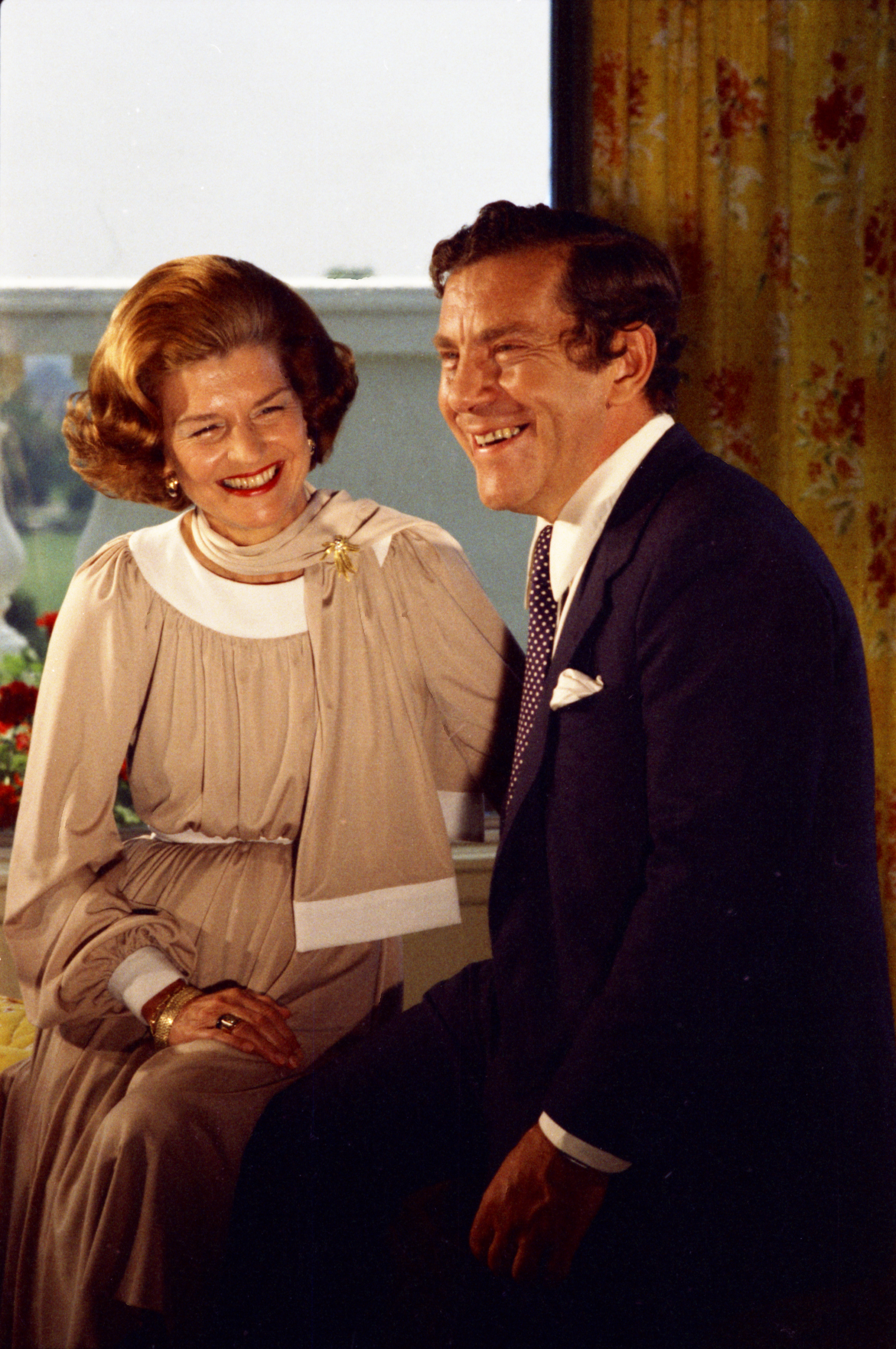
Betty Ford sits in the White House solarium with Morley Safer before filming her 60 Minutes interview with him.

Betty Ford, the first lady of the United States, filmed an interview with Morley Safer for the television news program 60 Minutes, which was broadcast on August 10, 1975. It was the first extensive interview that Ford had granted exclusively to a television outlet since becoming first lady. The broadcast of the interview saw strong interest from the public. After it aired, a number of Ford's remarks on hot-button social issues generated particularly great media attention.

== Background ==
The 60 Minutes interview was the first extensive interview that Ford had granted exclusively to a television outlet since becoming first lady when her husband, Gerald Ford, became President upon the resignation of Richard Nixon on August 9, 1974. It was arranged by the first lady's staff in order to better introduce her to the American public. Her staff believed that Safer would be able to highlight Ford's positive attributes. Several other television producers were turned down as potential outlets for such an interview. Ford had limited experience in similar media situations.

The interview was filmed in the solarium of the White House on July 21, 1975. The edited version was pre-screened and cleared for airing by the first lady's press office. Ford later disclosed that she felt uncomfortable during the interview, that several of the questions "terrified her", and that the medium of the interview (being taped) made her feel pressured into answering all of the questions she was asked.

== Content of the interview ==
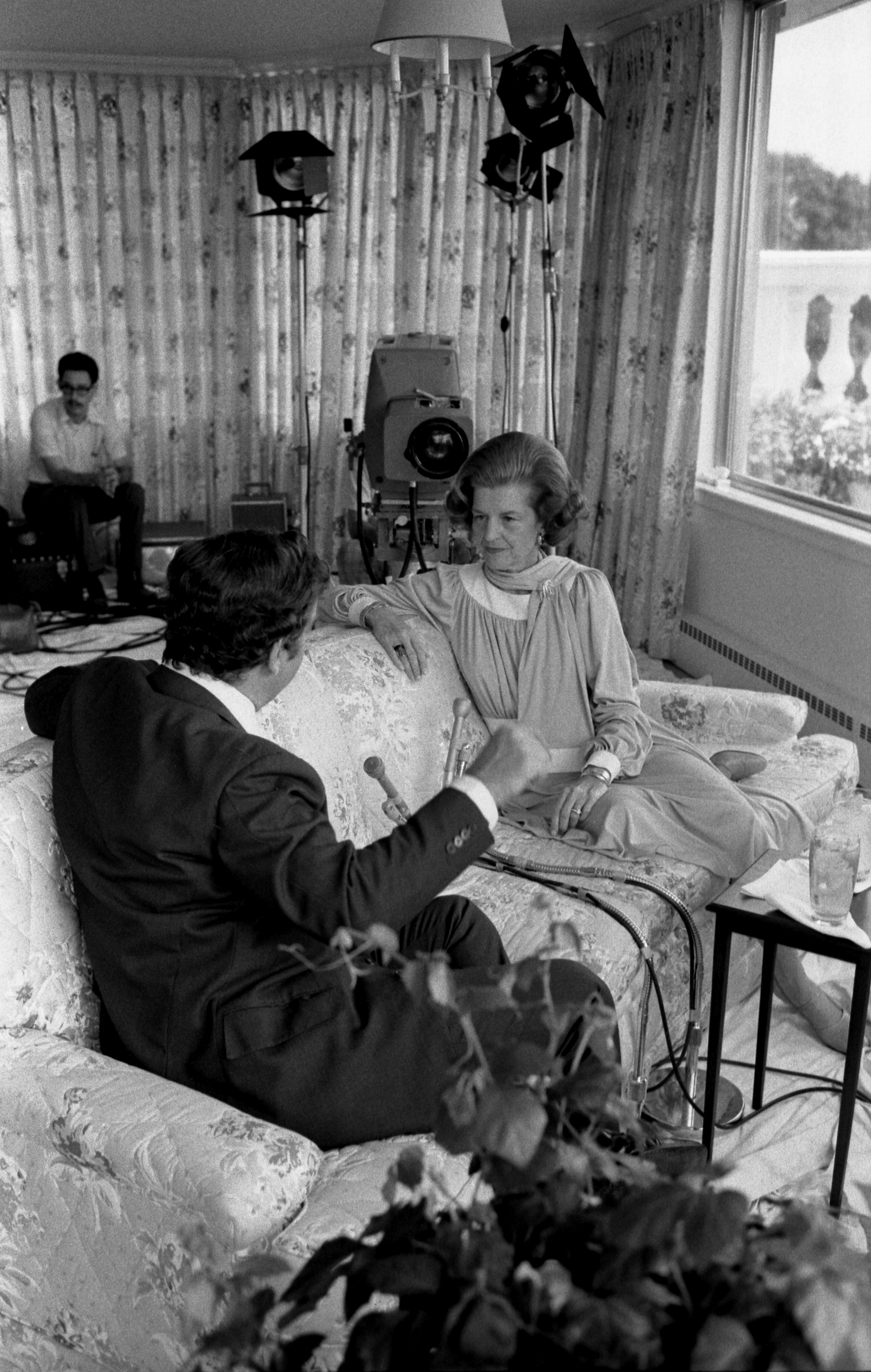
Safer interviewing Ford in the White House solarium

In the interview, Ford was characteristically candid in her answers to questions covering a variety of topics. Great media attention was given a portion of the interview where she answered a hypothetical about how she would counsel her daughter, Susan, if she was having premarital sex. Ford declared that she "would not be surprised" or angry if her daughter had sex or tried smoking marijuana. Ford further speculated in the interview that all four of her children had likely already tried marijuana, and that she herself would have probably also experimented with it if it had been more popular to do so when she was growing up. However, she also expressed faith that her children were largely uninterested in drugs. In her answers to such questions, Ford essentially expressed that she trusted her children to make wise decisions, and that she would be there for them even if they made unwise ones.

Ford also spoke in the interview about being tolerant and respectful of unwed couples who opted for premarital cohabitation, comments that she would later feel had been taken out of context by the public. She also expressed her full confidence in the marital fidelity of her husband, President Ford.

Ford voiced support during the interview for a variety of women's liberation causes. She called the Roe v. Wade decision of the United States Supreme Court on abortion "The best thing in the world...a great, great decision." She also voiced her support for the Equal Rights Amendment. However, Ford was also asked if she found some women's liberation advocates "a little bit hard to take", to which she responded that she did, and that she was not personally, "the type that's going to burn my bra or do something like that."

Ford also shared that she had been advised that there was no recurrence of the breast cancer for which she had been treated the previous year. This question came on the heels of a demanding trip Ford took with her husband visiting Eastern Europe in which she showed clear signs of physical exhaustion at several points.

Ford also commented that she expected herself to be authentic before the public while in the White House, recounting,

I told my husband if we have to go to the White House, "Okay, I will go. But I'm going as myself. It's too late to change my pattern. And if they don't like it, then they'll just have to throw me out."

== Reactions ==
The broadcast of the interview saw strong interest from the public. After it aired, a number of Ford's remarks in this interview on hot-button issues generated particularly great media attention.

The interview received conservative backlash. The National Review accused Ford of "rewriting the Ten Commandments over nationwide TV". Protesters dubbed Ford "no lady" instead of the first lady. The Woman's Christian Temperance Union issued a censure of Ford, marking the first time that they had censured a first lady since they censured Frances Cleveland for donning low-cut gowns. Initially, the White House was inundated with negative mail. However, once much of the public heard about the negative mail that the White House was receiving, a greater number of supportive letters were received.

Ford's outspoken comments caused advisors of Ford's husband dismay due to their attempts at restoring America's composure in the wake of Watergate. Due to conservative backlash from Ford's discussion of premarital sex, marijuana use, and abortion in the 60 Minutes interview, Ford's husband, President Ford initially privately quipped to her that her comments had lost him a large number votes. He would later make a similar quip to reporters. Within a day of the airing, President Ford was fielding press conferences about the interview, and attempted to take a neutral stance on what his wife had said. There were efforts to distance President Ford from the remarks without criticizing what his wife had said.

Polling, however, indicated that Ford's comments were accepted by many Americans. Roughly three months after the interview, a nationwide Harris poll of a sample of 1,519 adults found that 60% of Americans were in agreement and 27% of Americans were in disagreement with Ford's statements in the interview regarding how she would react if her daughter had an affair, and that 64% of Americans were in agreement and 23% of Americans in disagreement with her statement in the interview that if her daughter was having an affair she would want to know whether the man she was sexually involved with was nice or not. Harris also found that those the most in agreement with these statements of Ford's were younger voters and independent voters, while those who least-agreed were conservatives. It was noted that her husband was courting the support of conservatives to win the Republican nomination for the 1976 presidential election, but that the support of younger voters and independent voters would benefit him in the general election. An October 1975 opinion poll by the New York Daily News found that 60% of New Yorkers approved of her discussing the topics of premarital sex, marijuana use, and abortion, while 32% opposed. Within months of the interview, Betty Ford received approval ratings of 75%, demonstrating that, despite conservative backlash to her interview, she attained strong popularity. Polling around that time indicated her to be among the most popular first ladies.

The interview is regarded to have helped establish 60 Minutes' long-lasting prominence.
