= Campaign for America's Future =

American progressive organization

- Founded: 1996
- Founder: Roger Hickey; Robert Borosage
- Type: Nonprofit 501(c)(4) advocacy group
- Location: Washington, D.C., U.S.
- Website: Official website

Campaign for America's Future (CAF) is an American nonprofit progressive political advocacy organization. Founded in 1996, the organization bills itself as "the strategy center for the progressive movement."

Within the Democratic Party, it often serves as a counterweight to the Democratic Leadership Council (DLC). CAF argues that the Democratic Party should draw sharp contrasts with the Republicans and advance a progressive agenda, while the DLC argues that the party should pursue a centrist policy. CAF is a 501(c)(4) non-profit organization. It has a sister organization called the Institute for America's Future, which is a 501(c)(3) think tank "devoted to shaping a compelling progressive agenda and message."

The Nation editor Katrina vanden Heuvel, former AFL-CIO president John Sweeney, and former Los Angeles Mayor Antonio Villaraigosa serve on its board of directors.

== Organizational overview ==
The founder and current president of Campaign for America's Future, Robert Borosage, first registered the organization in 1990. The organization did not reach non-profit status until 1994 and formally launched in 1996. At its launch, the Campaign for America's Future listed 130 co-founders representing a variety of liberal and progressive organizations.

The Campaign for America's Future does not disclose its donors. In the past, it has denied requests for a list of top donors and a spokesman said the group "discloses exactly what is required."

In 2016, Campaign for America's Future combined their operations with People's Action but continues to operate as its own organization.

== Activities ==
=== "Take Back America" conference ===
CAF holds an annual "Take Back America" conference, bringing together progressive activists, elected officials, bloggers, left-leaning media outlets, and others.

At the 2006 conference, Senator Hillary Clinton was booed for her stance on the Iraq War. In 2007, she was similarly booed, but not as loudly, as she had ostensibly "modified" her position on the war. The Politico sponsored a straw poll which Senator Barack Obama won with 29 percent of the vote.

The 2007 conference honored "progressive bloggers" with the Paul Wellstone Award. The once anonymous blogger Digby accepted the award, and in doing so, revealed her true identity as woman named Heather Parton from Santa Monica, California.

CAF is supportive of the Occupy Wall Street movement and has assisted in organizing protests.

=== Apollo Alliance ===
The Institute for America's Future and the Center on Wisconsin Strategy sponsor a joint project called the Apollo Alliance, a coalition of environmentalists and labor unions, which seeks to commit the United States to energy independence while providing opportunity for new green-collar jobs in the energy sector. It is named after John F. Kennedy's Apollo program.
