= Morley Safer =

Canadian-American reporter and correspondent (1931–2016)

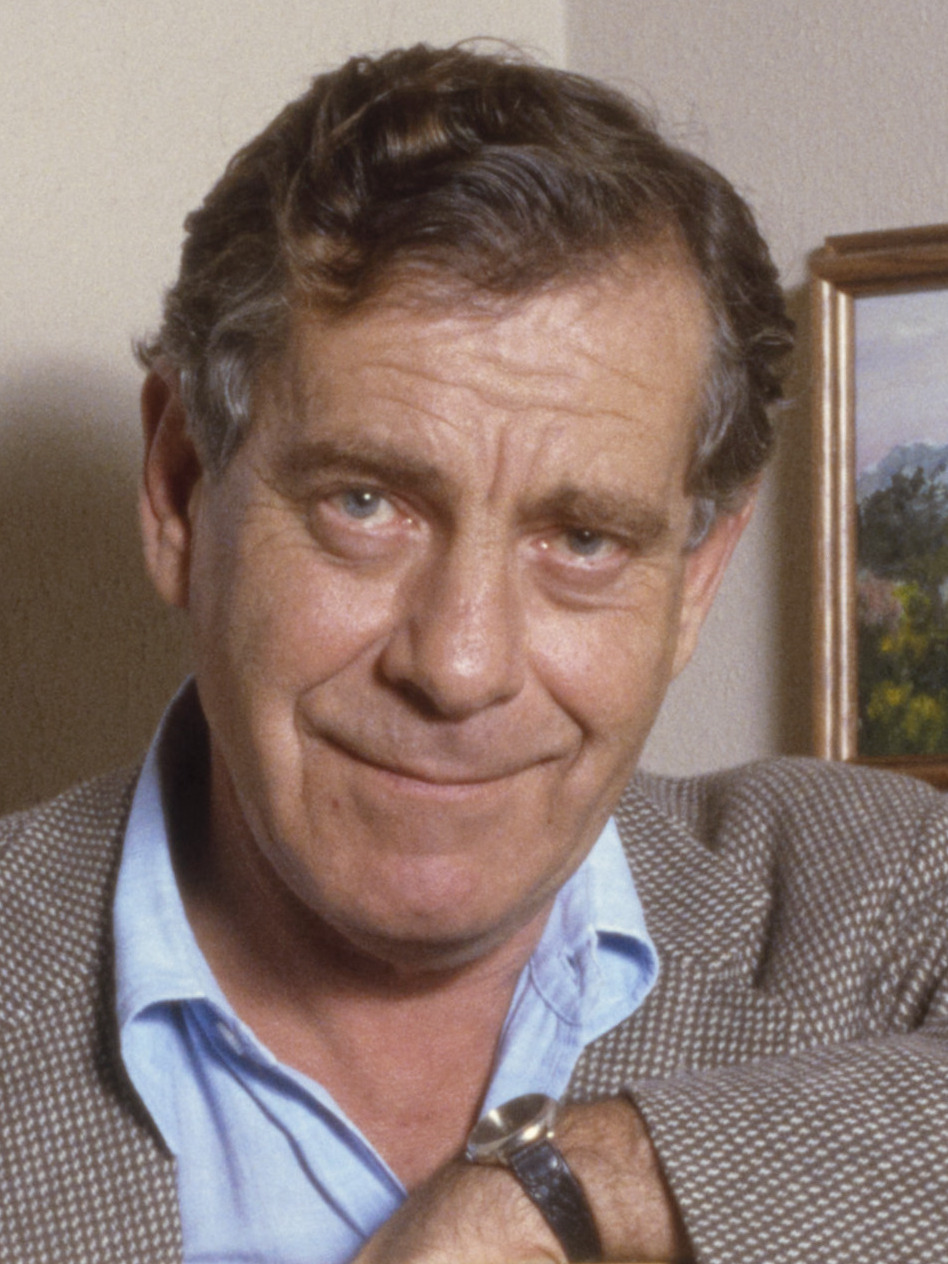
- Safer in 1985
- Born: November 8, 1931; Toronto, Ontario, Canada
- Died: May 19, 2016 (aged 84); New York City, U.S.
- Resting place: Roselawn Avenue Cemetery, Toronto
- Education: University of Western Ontario (dropped out)
- Occupations: Broadcast journalist, reporter and commentator
- Years active: 1955–2016
- Notable credit: 60 Minutes (1970–2016)
- Spouse: Jane Fearer (m. 1968)
- Children: 1

Morley Safer (November 8, 1931 – May 19, 2016) was a Canadian-American broadcast journalist, reporter, and correspondent for CBS News. He was best known for his long tenure on the news magazine 60 Minutes, whose cast he joined in 1970 after its second year on television, and where he became its longest-serving reporter.

During his 60-year career as a broadcast journalist, Safer received numerous awards, including 12 Emmys. In 2009, he donated his personal papers to the Dolph Briscoe Center for American History at the University of Texas at Austin.

Jeff Fager, executive producer of 60 Minutes, said "Morley has had a brilliant career as a reporter and as one of the most significant figures in CBS News history, on our broadcast and in many of our lives. Morley's curiosity, his sense of adventure and his superb writing, all made for exceptional work done by a remarkable man." Safer died a week after announcing his retirement from 60 Minutes.

== Early life ==
Safer was born to an Austrian Jewish family in Toronto, Ontario, the son of Anna (née Cohn) and Max Safer, an upholsterer. He had an older brother, Leon, and an older sister, Esther. After reading works by Ernest Hemingway, he had decided in his youth that, like Hemingway, he wanted to be a foreign correspondent. He attended Harbord Collegiate Institute and Bloor Collegiate Institute in Toronto, Ontario, and briefly attended the University of Western Ontario, before he dropped out to become a newspaper reporter. He has said, "I was a reporter on the street at 19 and never went to college."

== Career ==
Safer began his journalism career as a reporter for various newspapers in Ontario (Woodstock Sentinel-Review, London Free Press, and Toronto Telegram) and England (Reuters and Oxford Mail), in 1955. He later joined the Canadian Broadcasting Corporation (CBC) as a correspondent and producer.

=== International news and war correspondent ===
One of his first jobs with CBC was to produce CBC News Magazine in 1956, where his first on-screen appearance as a journalist was covering the Suez Crisis in Egypt. Still with the CBC, in 1961 he worked from London where he was assigned to cover major stories in Europe, North Africa and the Middle East, including the Algerian War of independence from France. Also in 1961, he was the only Western correspondent in East Berlin at the time the Communists began building the Berlin Wall.

In 1964, CBS hired Safer as a London-based correspondent, where he worked at the same desk that had once been used by Edward R. Murrow. The following year, in 1965, he became the first full-time staff reporter of the CBS News bureau in Saigon to cover the growing military conflict in Vietnam. By 1967, he was made the CBS bureau chief in London where he reported on numerous global conflicts, including the Nigerian Civil War, the Arab-Israeli war of 1967, and the Warsaw Pact invasion of Czechoslovakia in 1968. With the help of some clandestine skills, Safer and his news team became the first United States–based journalists to report from inside Communist China, broadcast in 1967 as a Special CBS News Report, "Morley Safer's Red China Diary".

Safer's Vietnam report, "The Burning of Cam Ne," broadcast on August 5, 1965, was notable and controversial because he had accompanied Marines to the village for what was described as a "search and destroy" mission. When the Marines arrived, they were fired on by snipers. They told the inhabitants to evacuate the village, which the Marines then burned down. Safer's report was among the earliest to paint a bleak picture of the Vietnam War, showing apparently innocent civilians as victims. However, many American military and political leaders judged the story to be harmful to United States interests and criticized CBS News for showing it. United States President Lyndon Johnson reacted to this report angrily, calling CBS's president and accusing Safer and his colleagues of having undermined America's role there. Safer's report received the George Polk Award in 1965.

Some ex-Marines who saw Safer's story on television during the war shared President Johnson's opinion. They claim that Safer never had time to be properly briefed on the operation, and was therefore not aware that four Marines had already been killed there and 27 wounded. Ex-Marine Larry Engelmann, author of a story on the Vietnam War, claimed Safer's story was "highly sensational". Justifying collective punishment, he alleged: "The fact is that this village had been a pretty tough village and these people had been warned repeatedly that the village would be torched if they continued to shoot at Marines … But there was none of that in Morley Safer's story."

In the PBS series Reporting America At War, Safer himself said, " … the denials themselves were absurd. [Officials claimed] I had gone on a practice operation in a model village—a village the Marines had built to train guys how to move into a village. Or the whole thing was a kind of 'Potemkin' story that I had concocted. There are still people who believe that." After the incident was broadcast, Marines were forbidden from burning any more villages.

While reporting another story from Vietnam, Safer and two CBS cameramen were shot down in a helicopter by Vietcong ground fire, although they all escaped serious injury. Brig. Gen. Joe Stringham, who commanded a Green Beret unit, commented that Safer "was all business and he reported what he saw… We looked at eternity right in the face a couple of times … and he was as cool as a hog on ice."

Safer received an Emmy Award in 1971 for his investigation and reporting of the Gulf of Tonkin incident. Although the war reports were consistently broadcast on television, Safer said it was the country's inability to clearly explain to the public why they were at war that became the main source of people's "disillusionment":

I've heard people say that if World War II had been televised we never would have stuck the course. That's bullshit. I think there was a pretty strong determination by most people in this country, not all, that this really was a war of survival of the most important things we hold dear, to put it in simple terms, including of our own democracy.

External videos
- Booknotes interview with Safer on Flashbacks: On Returning to Vietnam, May 1, 1990, C-SPAN

During his career as a war correspondent, Safer covered over nine wars. He authored the bestselling book, Flashbacks: On Returning to Vietnam. It describes his 1989 return to Vietnam and features his interviews with known and less-well-known Vietnamese people, most of them veterans of the war. His trip was the basis of a 60 Minutes show in 1989, which Safer said got a reaction of annoyance from some veterans, and a positive reaction from others.

=== 60 Minutes reporter ===
Morley was one of the most important journalists in any medium, ever. He broke ground in war reporting and made a name that will forever be synonymous with 60 Minutes. He was also a gentleman, a scholar, a great raconteur – all of those things and much more to generations of colleagues, his legion of friends, and his family, to whom all of us at CBS offer our sincerest condolences over the loss of one of CBS' and journalism's greatest treasures.

— Leslie Moonves
CBS Chairman and CEO

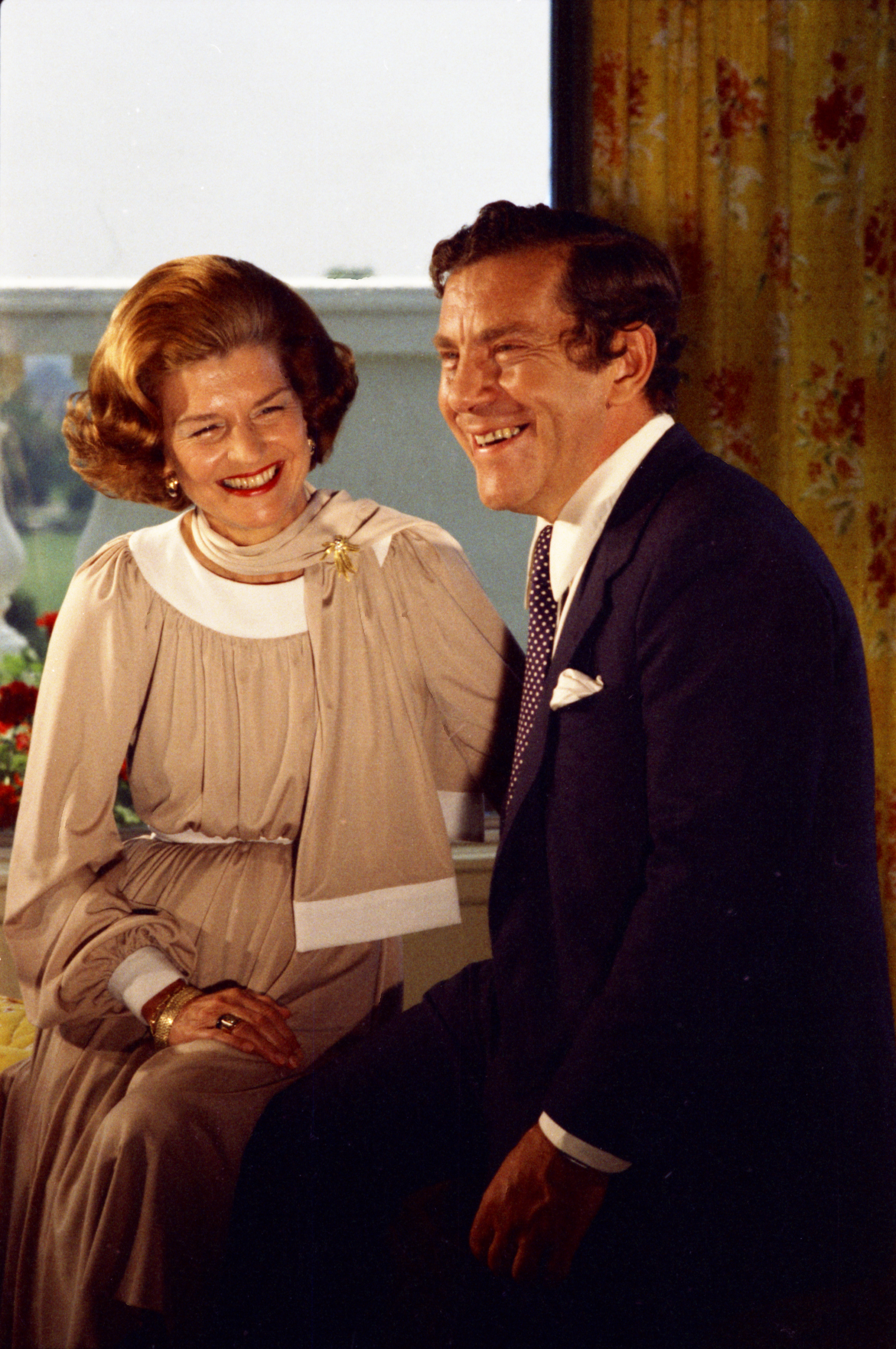
Safer sits with First Lady Betty Ford in the White House Solarium in August 1975 before filming an interview with her for 60 Minutes

In 1970, CBS producer Don Hewitt asked Safer to replace Harry Reasoner on 60 Minutes, as Reasoner had just left to anchor the ABC Evening News. Hewitt had created 60 Minutes, and he was, according to Diane Sawyer, the program's "guiding, self-renewing, revitalizing genius." Safer, who had been covering the funeral of Charles de Gaulle in Paris, accepted the new position and joined 60 Minutes.

The show had then aired for two seasons, and Safer, who had, until that time, reported and traveled alone, recalled that he accepted the new position on condition that if the show failed, he would be given his old job back, recalling that "I was the new kid, with a lot of pressure, because we were trying something new. We were utterly unheard of. I was utterly a stranger to working in a head office." Until then, said Safer, "my staff, when I was abroad, consisted of only me."

Over the subsequent decades, along with Safer, the other veteran reporters for the program included Dan Rather, Mike Wallace, Walter Cronkite, Ed Bradley, Charles Kuralt, Diane Sawyer and Bob Simon. Reasoner had also returned to do some 60 Minutes segments before he retired. 60 Minutes eventually became the most-watched and most profitable program in television history.

Safer's style of interviewing was consistently done in a friendly and gentlemanly manner, which gave him the ability to ask penetrating questions that average viewers might ask. He was persistent in the pursuit of facts needed to support the accuracy of his stories. While he often added his own point of view to reports, Safer always maintained high professional standards, a style that helped establish the tone of 60 Minutes shows. He typed stories on his manual typewriter even after computers were in common use. To investigate and write his 60 Minutes stories, Safer often traveled as much as 200,000 miles a year.

Hewitt credited Safer with having a "great eye for stories", whether they were sympathetic or tough. He could write about offbeat subjects to give the show flavor, such as a piece he did in Finland about the Finns' obsession with the tango dance. He could also write hardcore reports, such as one which helped save the life of a black man imprisoned in Texas. For that 1983 story, about Lenell Geter, a 25-year-old black aerospace engineer serving a life sentence for robbery, Safer sifted through details of the case and found factual inconsistencies and implied racial biases. After Safer's report was broadcast, Geter was exonerated and released in 1984. The story garnered numerous awards for Safer.

In 1986, during the anti-Duvalier protest movement, CBS colleague Mike Wallace arrived in Haiti ahead of Safer to interview Jean-Claude “Baby Doc” Duvalier, effectively scooping Safer's planned interview with the soon-to-be overthrown president. According to Fager, the incident inspired Safer to develop his signature 60 Minutes segment, “a whimsical well-told tale that nobody could steal”.

Red wine sales in the United States surged 40% within a year of Safer's 1991 segment on the French diet, highlighting red wine as, according to several studies and French researcher Serge Renaud, preventing blood clot-forming cells from clinging to artery walls, which may reduce the risk of heart attack. The healthy beverage notion remained until thoroughly refuted, by 2023, by subsequent studies of the 2000s. In 1994, he hosted a CBS News Special, One for the Road: A Conversation with Charles Kuralt and Morley Safer, which marked Kuralt's retirement from CBS.

His remarks, at the time of President Ronald Reagan's death, brought charges of liberal bias. Safer said about Reagan: "I don't think history has any reason to be kind to him."

Safer narrated several documentaries, including Exodus 1947 (1997), American Experience (1997), American Masters (1996), Bicentennial Minutes (1975), and Saigon (1957).

He retired after 46 years and 919 stories for CBS, a week before his death; by then, Safer had set the record for the show's longest-serving correspondent. A few days after he retired, CBS broadcast an hour-long special, Morley Safer: A Reporter's Life.

Following his death in 2016, the program's executive producer Jeff Fager told The Hollywood Reporter that, during their time at 60 Minutes together, "Some of the most fun I had with Morley was pranking each other or pranking other people", some incidents of which Fager recounts in his 2017 book, Fifty Years of 60 Minutes: The Inside Story of Television's Most Influential News Broadcast, revealing a culture at "60 Minutes, where practical jokes have always been the favorite sport."

== Recognition ==
In addition to an Emmy awarded for the Gulf of Tonkin report, he also won Emmys for other 60 Minutes stories, including "Pops" (1979); "Teddy Kollek's Jerusalem" (1979); "Air Force Surgeon" (Investigative Journalism, 1982); and "It Didn't Have to Happen" (Correspondent, 1982). During his 60-year career, Safer won every major award given in broadcast journalism, including 12 Emmys; a Lifetime Achievement Emmy from the National Academy of Television Arts and Sciences in 1966, when he was 35 (remarkable because the award is usually given after a lifetime of work); three Overseas Press Awards; three Peabody Awards; two Alfred I. duPont-Columbia University Awards; and the Paul White Award from the Radio-Television News Directors Association.

=== The Morley Safer Award for Outstanding Reporting ===
In January 2019, the Morley Safer Award was created and sent out a call for entries. A program of The University of Texas at Austin's Briscoe Center for American History, where Safer's archival papers are preserved; the Safer Award seeks to recognize a story or series of stories of creativity, vision and integrity. The award was presented Hannah Dreier for her ProPublica series, "Trapped in Gangland".

== Personal life ==
He married Jane Fearer, an anthropology student, in 1968 in London, where he was serving as bureau chief for CBS News. Their daughter, Sarah Alice Anne Safer, is a 1992 graduate of Brown University and a freelance journalist.

Safer maintained dual Canadian and American citizenship.

== Death ==
Safer died at his New York home from pneumonia on May 19, 2016, eight days after announcing his retirement from 60 Minutes following 46 seasons with the show. Four days prior to his death, CBS aired a special 60 Minutes episode covering Safer's 61-year journalism career. He is buried at Roselawn Avenue Cemetery in Toronto.

== Awards ==
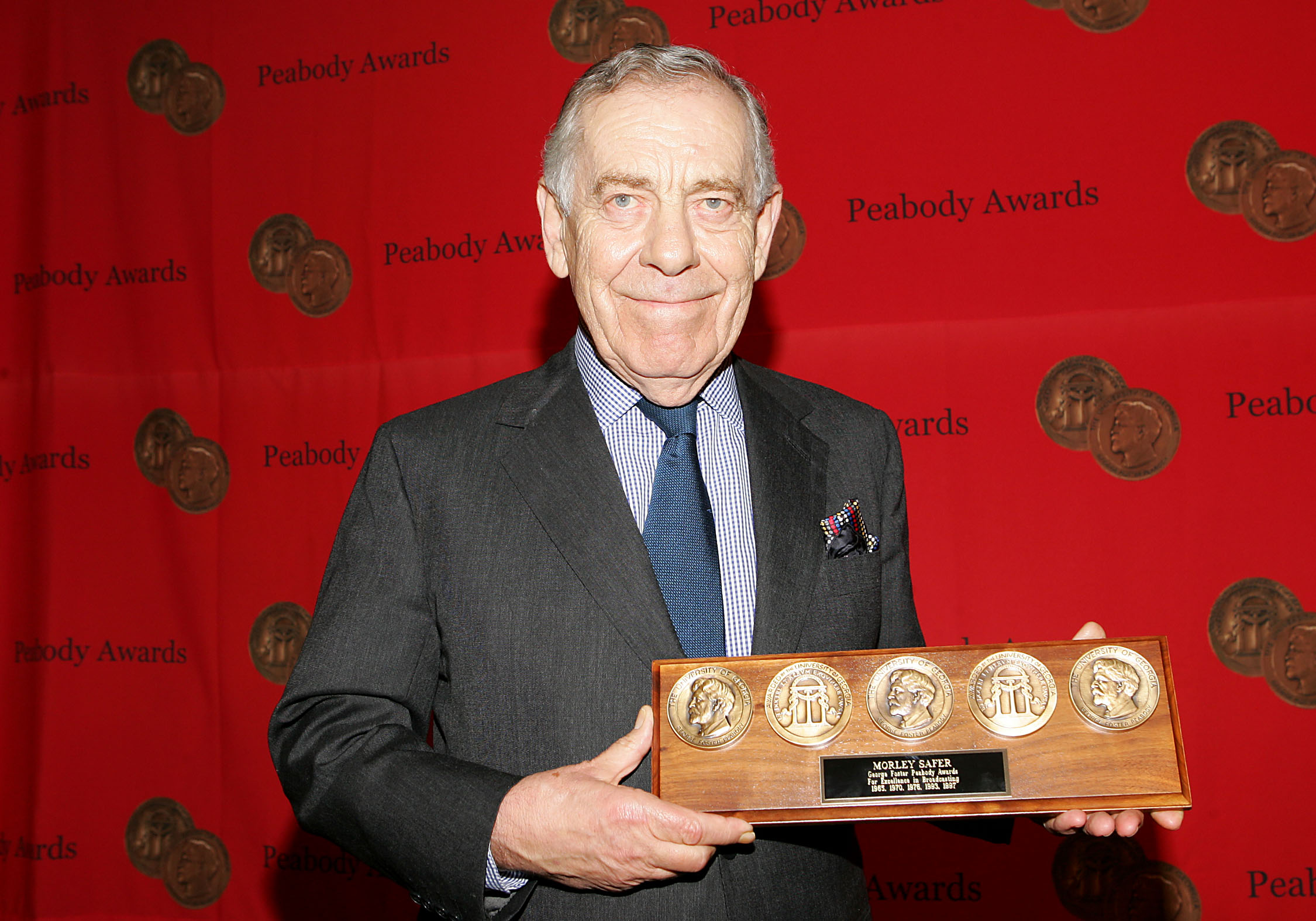
Safer at the 64th Annual Peabody Awards, 2005

- 12-time Emmy Award winner
- 3-time Overseas Press Award winner
- 3-time George Foster Peabody Award winner
- 2-time Alfred I. duPont–Columbia University Award winner
- Winner of the Paul White Award from the Radio-Television News Directors Association (1966)
- Recipient of a Lifetime Achievement Emmy from the National Academy of Television Arts and Sciences (2003)
- Received the 2003 George Polk Memorial Career Achievement Award from Long Island University
- Received the Robert F. Kennedy Journalism Awards' first prize for domestic television for his insightful report about a controversial school, "School for the Homeless"
- Named a Chevalier dans l'Ordre des Arts et des Lettres by the French government in 1995
- Received Brown University's Welles Hangen Award for Superior Achievement in Journalism (1993)
- Recipient of The International Center in New York's Award of Excellence

== See also ==
- Betty Ford's August 1975 60 Minutes interview
