= FBI Name Check =

The FBI Name Check is a background check procedure performed by the Federal Bureau of Investigation for federal agencies, components within the legislative, judicial, and executive branches of the federal government; foreign police and intelligence agencies; and state and local law enforcement agencies within the criminal justice system. The FBI Name Check is performed by the FBI as a part of the National Name Check Program, which dates back to Executive Order 10450 that was issued during the Eisenhower Administration. The FBI Name Check for an individual involves a search of the FBI's Central Records System Universal Index for any appearance of the name of the individual, as well as close phonetic variants and permutations of that name, in any of the records stored in the Universal Index. If any such occurrences are found, the Name Check also involves retrieval and analysis of the relevant paper and electronic files from local FBI offices and from other law-enforcement agencies.

FBI Name Checks are performed in relation to government employment and appointments, security clearances, admissions to the bar, attending White House functions, federal and state criminal investigations, counterintelligence and counterterrorism activities as well as applications for visas, green cards, and for naturalization.

One of the biggest customers of the National Name Check Program (NNCP) is USCIS (formerly INS) which, since late 2002 requires comprehensive FBI Name Checks for all applicants for permanent residence (green card) and for naturalization.

== Details of the FBI name check process ==
The FBI website and congressional testimony by the FBI officials provide a detailed step-by-step description of the Name Check Process:

- The first step consists in running a particular name, as well as its close phonetic variants and permutations, through the Universal Index (UNI) of the FBI's Central Records System (CRS). The CRS encompasses the centralized records of FBI Headquarters, field offices, and Legal Attache offices. The CRS contains all FBI investigative, administrative, personnel, and general files. The UNI is searched for "main files", files where the name of an individual is the subject of an FBI investigation, and for "reference files", files where the name being searched is just mentioned in an investigation in any context or capacity (including witnesses, victims, neighbors, relatives, co-workers, bystanders, and so on).
- If the initial search of UNI returns no records, the individual's Name Check is cleared. FBI maintains that the majority of the Name Checks are electronically returned as "no record" within 48–72 hours.
- If the initial search results in some "hits" (mentions of the name of the subject of the search or of close variants of that name), a more detailed search is conducted. This more detailed search may involve an NNCP officer requesting from the local offices the actual electronic and physical files related to "hits" that the initial search of UNI generated. After receipt, these files are manually analyzed by an NNCP officer to determine if they pertain to the actual subject of the Name Check and if they contain any derogatory information about that subject; additional files may be requested later and the entire process may be repeated several times. In the process NNCP officers need coordinate with 56 field offices and retrieve files stored in 265 locations nationwide.
- Less detailed Name Checks are also possible. The agency requesting a Name Check pays FBI a fee that depends on the level of detail required. The requesting agency can also specify different levels of priority and set specific deadlines for the Name Checks that it requests.

=== Use of name checks for immigration purposes ===
There is no federal law that specifically requires that FBI Name Check be used for any type of immigration benefits. Federal law does require that applicants for various types of immigration benefits undergo background checks, but the specific procedures to be used are not explicitly mandated. The specific procedures to be used are determined by USCIS (not the FBI) as a matter of internal policy.

Until 2002 INS used a limited form of a Name Check for applicants for asylum, permanent resident status, and naturalization: the applicant's fingerprints were checked against existing criminal databases for records of arrests and criminal convictions, and UNI was searched for "main files" to determine if the applicant has been the target of an FBI investigation. In late 2002 INS discovered a case where an individual, who has been naturalized, was involved, as a secondary party, in a terrorism investigation. Subsequently, INS changed its policy and started requiring that maximally comprehensive FBI Name Check, including the search and detailed examination of all the "reference files", be completed for all naturalization applicants before their applications are granted. Soon thereafter a similar policy was adopted for the adjustment of status and asylum applicants.

== Criticism and controversy ==
The Name Check process and the way in which it is used are blamed some by immigration advocates, political commentators, and government officials for creating substantial delays in the processing of green card and citizenship applications.

Immigrants affected by green card and naturalization delays due to pending FBI Name Checks have filed numerous lawsuits against the government trying to compel action on their applications. These lawsuits have had varying degrees of success but in many cases federal judges criticized the USCIS policy. The lawsuits have been widely reported in the press and have been discussed in various congressional hearings.

According to the 2007 annual report of the CIS Ombudsman, as of May 2007, "USCIS reported 329,160 FBI name check cases pending. Approximately 64% (211,341) of those cases have been pending more than 90 days and approximately 32% (106,738) have been pending more than one year. There are now 93,358 more name check cases pending than last year, and 31,144 FBI name check cases pending more than 33 months". The report also states: "FBI name checks, one of the security screening tools used by USCIS, may be the single biggest obstacle to the timely and efficient delivery of immigration benefits". The delays due to pending FBI Name Checks for naturalization applications are expected to increase due to a substantial surge in the number of naturalization applications in the spring-summer of 2007 that happened before a significant increase in the USCIS application fees.

Many immigration advocacy groups maintain that the use of the FBI Name Check process by USCIS is unproductive and even counter-productive in accomplishing the stated national security goals of the USCIS policy while at the same time causing unreasonable delays for large numbers of applicants. Most people affected by FBI Name Check delays are already authorized to work and stay in the United States while their applications are pending. Critics assert that the current USCIS policy does not result in identifying and detaining genuinely dangerous individuals quickly but rather allows them to legally remain in the United States essentially indefinitely, while at the same time causing unreasonable delays in the processing of applications of tens of thousands law-abiding applicants. This view is also expressed in a number of court decisions related to the FBI Name Check delays. Thus in a 2008 ruling in a lawsuit by a Romanian naturalization applicant, U.S. District Judge Michael Baylson wrote: "If these individuals are potentially dangerous to the United States, it would seem their applications should be expedited over all other work. ... Some plaintiffs in these cases have been waiting over three years for a decision...Delaying their citizenship status does not eliminate the danger they may pose to the United States. ... It would seem that this group, estimated at 1 percent of all applicants, should be investigated more quickly, not more slowly, than everyone else."

A similar point is raised in the 2007 annual report of the CIS Ombudsman.

The November 2005 report by the DHS Office of Inspector General criticised the internal processes and procedures used by USCIS in relation to FBI name checks and suggested developing a risk assessment based approach in conducting the FBI Name Checks.

In various public statements and congressional testimony USCIS and DHS officials acknowledge that delays due to pending FBI Name Checks place significant burdens on many law-abiding applicants for immigration benefits. Nevertheless, USCIS maintains that there is considerable national security value in performing full FBI Name Checks since they often do reveal more detailed information than the more limited background checks used previously.

In its response to the 2006 USCIS Ombudsman's Report, USCIS stated:

Although these security checks may require a more lengthy processing time, USCIS believes that performing them is essential to identifying national security and public safety concerns that would not have been uncovered by other means. This is particularly true given that in, a few cases, the information obtained from the FBI through this process has reflected very significant issues and risks. FBI name checks disclose information to USCIS that is otherwise not available. Information contained in 39% of the FBI positive responses (letterhead memoranda) received in FY 06 was not contained in IBIS/TECS, USCIS' primary background check tool. Upon receiving authorization from the FBI, this information is used to interview applicants seeking immigration benefits and to make adjudicative decisions. For that reason, although a heavy price is paid in inquiries, mandamus actions, and other forms of litigation, USCIS is committed to effective background checks, and thus is committed to the FBI name check.

== Recent developments ==
=== February 2008 USCIS policy change ===
In a February 4, 2008 memorandum, Michael Aytes, Director of Domestic Operations at USCIS, announced a change in policy regarding FBI Name Checks in relation to the adjustment of status (green card) applicants. Under the new policy, if a Name Check for an adjustment of status applicant has been pending for over 180 days, USCIS may approve the adjustment of status application. The FBI Name check will still be required to be completed in such cases and, if upon completion of the check, serious adverse information is discovered, USCIS may revoke the green card of the individual in question and may deport that individual. Naturalization applications are not affected by this change in policy. For these applications the FBI Name Check is still required to be completed before an application is approved.

In a March 3, 2008 round table DHS Secretary Michael Chertoff put forward the rationale for this policy change by stating that the new policy poses minimal risk to national security while providing relief to thousands of law-abiding green card applicants.

USCIS officials stated that the new policy does not apply to citizenship applications since it is much harder to revoke a naturalization than a green card.

=== Joint USCIS–FBI effort on reducing the Name Check backlog ===
On April 2, 2008, USCIS and FBI announced a joint plan eliminating the backlog of FBI Name Checks The plan calls for putting additional resources into processing of FBI Name Checks requested by the USCIS and sets the following Name Check backlog elimination schedule:

- May 2008: Process all name checks pending more than three years.
- July 2008: Process all name checks pending more than two years.
- November 2008: Process all name checks pending more than one year.
- February 2009: Process all name checks pending more than 180 days.
- June 2009: Process 98% of all name checks within 30 days and process the remaining two percent within 90 days.

Immigration advocacy groups welcomed this effort but expressed skepticism that the timetable for backlog reduction set by USCIS and FBI is realistic. On September 9, 2008, the CIS Ombudsman announced that USCIS and FBI have met the goal of processing all FBI name checks pending for more than two years by July 2008.

== See also ==
- FBI
- Green card
- United States nationality law
- USCIS
