= Ellen Sue Miller =

American writer

Ellen Miller (1967–December 23, 2008) was an American fiction writer. She was born and raised in the Canarsie section of Brooklyn, New York, and lived in New York's East Village for the last 20 years of her life. She attended Wesleyan University, where she studied with Annie Dillard, and then at the 92nd Street Y and the New York University Creative Writing Program. She was a fellow at the McDowell Colony and taught at NYU and the New School.

Miller's novel Like Being Killed was published in 1998 and appeared briefly on the San Francisco Chronicle bestseller list. It was the only book she published before her death in 2008. Her short fiction appeared in the anthologies 110 Stories: New York Writes After September 11, Brooklyn Noir, and Lost Tribe: Jewish Fiction from the Edge.

Like Being Killed tells the story of Ilyana Myerovich in a "grueling depiction of a young woman's heroin-assisted downward spiral." Publishers Weekly said of Like Being Killed: "Like its narrator--overweight, overeducated, cynical 25-year-old East Village junkie Ilyana Meyerovich--Miller's debut is a downer too smart to write off, a ramshackle, sentimental novel distinguished by a voice full of vibrant, self-loathing intelligence." The novel initially received mixed reviews and little fanfare, and found renewed attention when Maggie Nelson mentioned it in several interviews and later in an extended discussion in On Freedom. Nelson wrote in The Millions: "Like Being Killed is also a junkie's tale, along with a story of friendship, the Lower East Side, Jewishness, AIDS, the fraughtness of being fat, being female, and more. I was so taken with its erudition, abjection, and opulence that I immediately looked for anything else Miller had written, and was crestfallen to discover that she'd died in 2008 at age 41, leaving this novel her only offering."

Miller discussed her interest in extreme situations, and putting her character in such situations, with The Austin Chronicle: "The fact is, I'm fascinated by a lot of extreme things, not just those in this book. If you were in my apartment, you'd see, I've got a whole big shelf the size of a wall of books about the Holocaust, other shelves about war, five books about Kaspar Hauser, the 19th-century Germany boy who was locked in the basement and never exposed to light, given food and water through a chute. When I read Primo Levi on the Holocaust, for example, or Tim O'Brien on Vietnam, or books about Kaspar Hauser, it transports me to the extreme, makes me question our apparent distance from it, and lets me think about how I or anybody else might act in such situations."

Miller collapsed in a Lower East Side bodega, having suffered a heart attack, and remained an unidentified Jane Doe for two days. She was 41 years old.
