= Roger Hickey =

American political activist and economic policy advocate

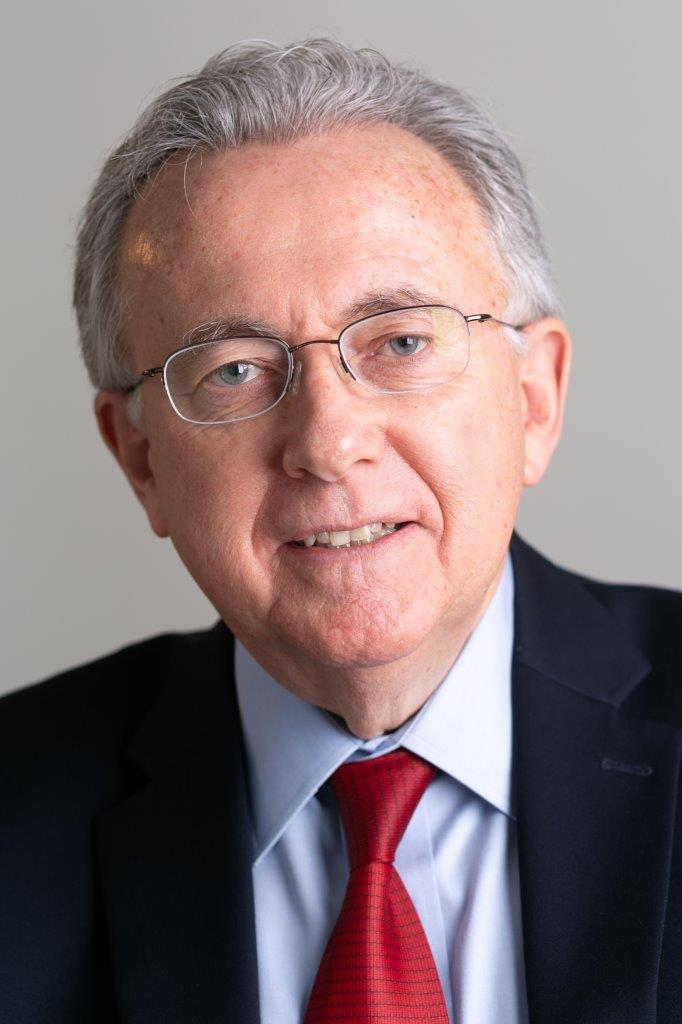
- Education: University of Virginia
- Years active: 1965–present
- Organization: Campaign for America's Future Economic Policy Institute

Roger Hickey is an American political activist and economic policy advocate. He has co-founded think tanks, organizations, and grassroots coalitions, including the Economic Policy Institute, Campaign for America's Future, and Americans United to Protect Social Security.

== Early activism and career ==
Hickey began his career as an organizer in the late 1960s while attending the University of Virginia, working with the Virginia Students Civil Rights Committee and the Southern Student Organizing Committee. In 1972 he joined Clergy and Laymen Concerned About Vietnam (CALC), an organization of religious leaders opposed to the US war in Vietnam. Hickey was a producer for CALC's "Help Unsell the War" campaign, creating TV, radio, and print advertisements that expressed opposition to the war.

In 1973 Hickey co-founded the Public Media Center in San Francisco. As Media Director, he developed advertising campaigns for environmental groups, peace and disarmament organizations, labor unions, women's and minority education, and other public interest issues. The Public Media Center won the first FCC Fairness Doctrine ruling requiring broadcasters to provide free air time for antinuclear TV spots in response to pro-nuclear utility advertising.

Hickey was an associate director of the National Center for Economic Alternatives, and during the Jimmy Carter administration, he—along with Mark Green and Gar Alperovitz—organized Consumers Opposed to Inflation in the Necessities (COIN), which "mobilized over sixty organizations addressing the needs of consumers, senior citizens, the environment, and energy supply, as well as gaining broad support from organized labor" to support a progressive program to control inflation.

In 1986, Hickey collaborated with economist Jeff Faux to establish the Economic Policy Institute (EPI). Hickey served as EPI's vice president and firector of communications.

== Campaign for America's Future ==
Hickey is co-director of the Campaign for America's Future (CAF), launched in 1996. CAF bills itself as a "strategy center of the progressive movement". Most recently, under the auspices of CAF, he co-authored "The Solidarity Agenda", a 5-point economic agenda signed by 100 citizen leaders and activists. Their statement calls for a "citizens' movement that will stand up to big money and fight for economic changes that will build a prosperous and sustainable American economy, create economic growth and opportunity for all, and reverse inequality".

As co-director (with Robert Borosage) of CAF and the Institute for America's Future, Hickey also organized a series of annual "Take Back America" conferences that brought together thinkers and progressive activists, media, and elected-officials. In 2008, he was a founder of Health Care for America Now!, a coalition of over 1,000 national and local organizations aimed at reforming the US healthcare system and securing health insurance for all Americans. Working with Yale political scientist Jacob Hacker, Hickey helped promote the public option, a policy that was endorsed by candidates Barack Obama and Hillary Clinton. During the Bush administration, he and CAF helped lead a campaign to stop the privatization of Social Security, called Americans United to Protect Social Security. Hickey, Borosage, and others created the Apollo Alliance to advocate for a public investment program on the scale of the US Moon mission. The goal of the alliance is to dramatically reduce greenhouse emissions and create sustainable jobs.

== Writing and appearances ==
Hickey has appeared on television and radio, and has written for a number of publications including The New York Times, The American Prospect, AlterNet, Common Dreams, HuffPost, The Nation, and Truthout. In 2001, Hickey and Robert Borosage co-edited The Next Agenda: Blueprint for a New Progressive Movement, a book of essays written by some of America's "most progressive thinkers and activists" at the time.
