= Cam Ne incident =

War incident

Coordinates: 15°59′11″N 108°10′27″E

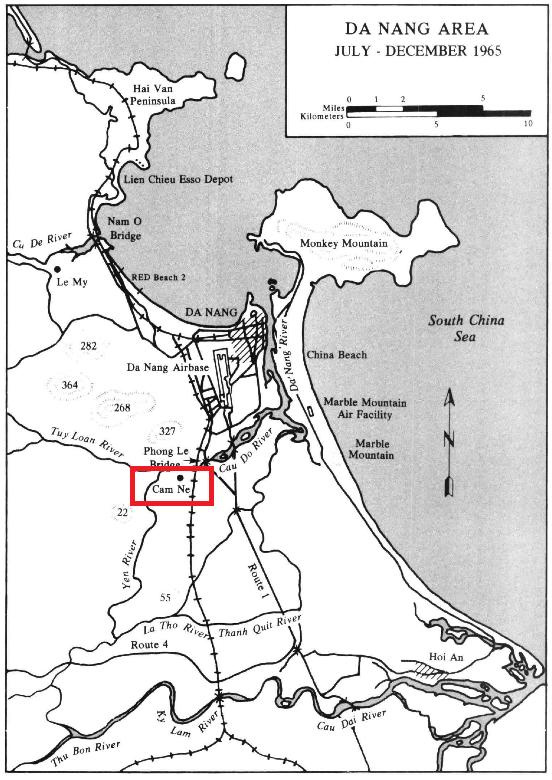
The Da Nang area, with Cam Ne indicated in red

The Cam Ne incident was a Vietnam War incident in which U.S. Marines burned the huts of South Vietnamese civilians living in the village of Cam Ne in Quảng Nam Province, South Vietnam. The incident became one of the top news stories in the United States about the war.

== Background ==
On 2 July 1965, following a Viet Cong (VC) mortar and sapper attack on Da Nang Air Base that destroyed three aircraft and damaged a further three, the United States Marine Corps tactical area of responsibility was extended south of the base to a line 5 miles (8.0 km) south of the Cầu Đỏ River. This area had been a stronghold of the Viet Minh during the French Indochina War and remained a VC stronghold.

On 12 July, units of the 1st Battalion, 9th Marines operating around Cam Ne received fire from a VC force coming from the hamlet of Cam Ne 4 (numbered in order to identify it in the complex of six villages of the same name). Patrolling in the area continued during July and into August. Commonplace military procedure for US forces when villages or areas were generally uncooperative or hostile were to burn down the villages and rounding up civilians for deportation to refugee camps in urban areas or RVN-controlled areas.

On 3 August, Company D, 1/9 Marines was sent to Cam Ne in support of Operation Blastout with orders to destroy the VC forces and their fortifications, including any structures from which they received fire. As the Marines moved into Cam Ne they were met with sporadic fire, wounding one Marine, but the VC withdrew. The entire village was extensively entrenched and fortified and the Marines found 267 punji stick traps, 3 grenade booby traps and 6 anti-personnel mines. The Marines then proceeded to destroy 51 huts and 38 trenches, tunnels and fighting positions. With dusk approaching the Marines began to withdraw and again came under fire from the VC, the Marines then called in an artillery and mortar barrage and four 105mm shells and 21 81mm mortar rounds hit the VC positions.

=== The CBS Report ===
CBS news correspondent Morley Safer was in Da Nang to report on Marine activities. On 3 August Safer joined the Marines headed for Cam Ne. Safer was accompanied by a South Vietnamese cameraman, Ha Tue Can a local VC official. The operation at Cam Ne was filmed by Can and narrated by Safer. The film showed a Marine, armed with a rifle, lighting a hut with his cigarette lighter. No opposition was evident. According to Safer's report, the Marines were under orders to burn to the ground any hamlet from which they received even a single burst of sniper fire. Old men and women who were pleading for the Marines to spare their houses were ignored. The houses and personal belongings were burned. Pleas from the villagers to delay while their possessions were removed were ignored. All rice stores were burned. The day's operation netted four prisoners, all of whom were old men.

CBS realized they had an important and powerful story as soon as it was received in New York. CBS News President Fred Friendly confirmed the validity of the story with Safer. The images were shocking, but the network felt the story was important and should be shown. The incident was broadcast on CBS Evening News on 5 August 1965.

Reaction to the Cam Ne report was immediate and powerful. CBS was inundated with calls and letters critical of this negative portrayal of American military personnel. The day after the film was broadcast, U. S. President Lyndon Johnson telephoned CBS President Frank Stanton to complain the report insulted the American flag. The President ordered a background investigation on Safer, certain he was working for the communists. No such affiliation was found. LBJ next ordered an investigation of the Marine officer in charge of the Cam Ne operation, certain Safer must have bribed the Marine to burn Cam Ne. Nothing came of this either. The Pentagon asked CBS to replace Safer as Vietnam correspondent. The Department of Defense began monitoring the evening television newscasts. Safer followed up his initial report with additional broadcasts critical of Marine operations in the area. The commander of the Marines in Vietnam, Major General Lew Walt, banned Safer from all of I Corps, the Marine Corps area of responsibility in South Vietnam (the order was later rescinded).

In the days that followed, the U.S. media carried additional stories of the impact of Marine operations on South Vietnamese civilians around Da Nang.

=== The Marine Corps perspective ===
The huts were burned to ensure they would not be reused by VC forces after the Americans moved on. The Viet Cong force estimated to be between 30 and 100 strong had fired upon the Marines as they withdrew from the village. Four Marines were wounded and one Vietnamese child was killed in the fighting. No enemy bodies were found; the Marines assumed they carried off their dead. The Marines used great force on August 3 at Cam Ne because they expected it to be occupied by Viet Cong soldiers. They had taken casualties there the previous month. They felt the CBS report was distorted and were critical of CBS for telling only part of the story.

On 9 August, another Marine unit operating near Cam Ne came under enemy fire: two Marines were killed and more than twenty were wounded. The Marines decided to complete the job of securing the area. On 18 August the Marines returned in force, but this time, the villagers were given full warning. In addition to searching Cam Ne, the Marines built shelters for Vietnamese civilians. The entire village was cleared. No VC were found in Cam Ne and there were no casualties.

== Conclusion ==
Over a year later during two Operation County Fair a joint US-ARVN sweep of the village complex (not necessarily the same village as Cam Ne refers to a set of six villages) on 17 March 1966, 3rd Battalion, 3rd Marines claiming to have killed 2 VC in the village and captured a suspected VC nurse and held 13 others for questioning and found two ARVN deserters.

In order to balance its initial, critical reports, subsequent CBS reports presented positive aspects of Marine operations in the Cam Ne area. COMUSMACV General William Westmoreland ordered the preparation of new guidelines concerning contact between U.S. military forces and Vietnamese civilians. Published in September 1968 nearly 3 years after the event, the rules forbade indiscriminate destruction of populated areas. When possible, villagers were to receive advance warning of upcoming assaults. South Vietnamese troops would accompany the American forces to assist in searching dwellings and communicating with civilians. Although the Pentagon considered censoring American journalists reporting from Vietnam, the plans were never adopted.
