= On the Table =

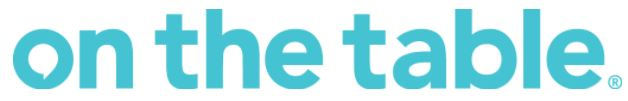
On The Table Logo 2014

On The Table is an initiative started by The Chicago Community Trust. On a single day individual hosts invite a small group of people (6-12) to a conversation over food. Hosts have included civic leaders and community organizations, but anyone can register to host, and who is invited is entirely up to the host. Ideally those invited do not know each other well except for their connection to the host. There is no agenda or pre-determined outcome of the conversation except to catalog what was discussed and what actions were suggested to address the concerns of participants. The results of the conversations are summarized and reported back to the community in a formal report.

The Chicago Community Trust created and organized the first On the Table event in 2014 and since then more than 30 communities have held On the Table events. More than 250,000 people have participated.

== History ==
The Chicago Community Trust held a series of “Chicago Dinners” in the late 1990s and early 2000s in partnership with the Human Relations Commission, bringing together area residents from different races and ethnicities to talk about race relations. In 2014, the Trust organized the first ever On the Table to engage everyday residents in discussing ways to improve the community. More than 11,500 people participated and it has continued in Chicago every year since.

In the following year 25,000 participated, then 55,000 in 2016, and 100,000 in 2017 roughly doubling every year. In 2016, the Trust added a new component, the Acting Up awards – small financial awards to sponsor ideas discussed during On the Table conversations.

== Expansion and replication ==
In 2017, The John S. and James L. Knight Foundation provided $2 million in new funding to expand the program to a dozen other cities. In 2019, The Chicago Community Trust and the Knight Foundation partnered to launch the National Learning Network, a virtual learning community for foundations, civic institutions, and nonprofit leaders who have implemented or have shown interest in replicating the On the Table model.

== Events ==
Location	Organization	Initiative Name (If not On the Table)	Affiliation	2014	2015	2016	2017	2018	2019	Website
Akron, OH	Akron Community Foundation		Knight City				October 3, 2017	October 3, 2018	October 3, 2019	https://www.onthetableakron.com/
Bedford, MA	AHA! (Art, History & Architecture)	Our Story					February 9, 2017			http://www.ahanewbedford.org/ourstory.php
Birmingham, AL	Birmingham Foundation	Kitchen Table		April 8, 2014	April, 7, 2015					http://www.birminghamkitchentable.com/
Bozeman, MT	Bozeman Community Foundation	A Seat at the Table						October 25, 2018		https://www.atthetablegv.org
Charleston, SC	The Library Foundation							October 4, 2018		https://www.lowcountryonthetable.org/
Charlotte, NC	Foundation for the Carolinas		Knight City				October 25, 2017	October 24, 2018		https://www.onthetableclt.org/
Chicago, IL	Chicago Community Trust			May 12, 2014	May 12, 2015	May 10, 2016	May 16, 2017	May 8, 2018	May 14, 2019	http://onthetable.com
Cleveland, OH	Cleveland Foundation	Common Ground					June 30, 2017			https://www.clevelandfoundation.org/news/common-ground/
Columbia, SC	Central Carolina Community Foundation		Knight City					October 24, 2018		https://onthetablecola.org/
Columbus, GA	Community Foundation of the Chattahoochee Valley		Knight City				November 7, 2017	October 23, 2018		http://www.onthetablechatt.com/
Columbus, OH	The Columbus Foundation	The Big Table				August 1, 2016	May 17, 2017	August 29, 2018	August 28, 2019	https://columbusfoundation.org/the-big-table
Denver, CO	University of Denver	A Community Table						September 17-20, 2018	April 10, 2019	https://www.du.edu/ccesl/ourwork/grand-challenges/act.html
Detroit, MI	Community Foundation For Southeast Michigan		Knight City				October 4, 2017			https://cfsem.org/initiative/on-the-table/
Franklin, TN	Franklin Tomorrow							October 30, 2018		https://franklintomorrow.org/onthetable/
Gary, IN	Legacy Foundation		Knight City				September 26, 2017			https://www.legacyfdn.org/onthetable/
Georgetown, TX	City of Georgetown							October 2, 2018		https://2030.georgetown.org/how-do-i-get-involved/ott/
Jefferson Hills, PA	Jefferson Regional Foundation	Around the Table South						October 15-19, 2018		https://aroundthetablesouth.org/
Lancaster, PA	Lancaster County Community Foundation	At the Table				May 20-21, 2016				https://atthetablelanc.com/es/indice/
Lexington, KY	Blue Grass Community Foundation		Knight City				March 15, 2017	March 28, 2018		https://www.bgcf.org/onthetable
Long Beach, CA	Long Beach Community Foundation	Around the Table	Knight City				September 27, 2017	December 3-4, 2018		https://www.aroundthetablelb.com/
Macon, GA	Community Foundation of Central Georgia		Knight City						October 17, 2019	https://onthetablemacon.com/
Marshall County, KY	Lexington Public Library Foundation	The Community Table						September 12, 2018		https://www.marshallcolibrary.org/resources/community-table
Miami, FL	The Miami Foundation	My Miami Story	Knight City			October 28, 2016	October 17, 2017	October 23, 2018		https://miamifoundation.org/mymiamistory/
Milwaukee, WI	Greater Milwaukee Foundation						October 17, 2017	October 9, 2018		http://onthetablemke.org/
National	Independent Sector	Threads: Community Conversations			March – August 2015			Independent Sector did a series of OTT's 2018		https://independentsector.org/resource/threads/
National	SAGE Foundation	SAGE Table					May 18, 2017	April 26, 2018		http://www.sagetable.org/about-us/our-team/
Orlando, FL		Southwest Florida Community Foundation							October 17, 2019	https://floridacommunity.com/on-the-table/
Philadelphia, PA	The Philadelphia Foundation		Knight City				May 23, 2017	November 8, 2018		https://www.philafound.org/OurWork/Updates/OnTheTablePhilly.aspx
Pittsburgh, PA	Jefferson Regional Foundation	Around the Table South						October 15-19, 2018		https://aroundthetablesouth.org/about/
Silicon Valley Region, CA	Silicon Valley Community Foundation		Knight City				November 15, 2017	October 25, 2018		https://www.siliconvalleycf.org/onthetable
State of Colorado	Colorado Foundation	At the Table						September 17-20, 2018		https://atthetablecolorado.org/
Toronto, ON, Canada	Toronto Foundation	1000 Dinners TO		October 14, 2014						https://rexdalelab.wordpress.com/2015/07/30/1000-dinners-toronto-2014-final-report/
Vancouver, BC	Vancouver Foundation							September 13, 2018		https://onthetablebc.com/
West Palm Beach, FL	Community Foundation for Palm Beach and Martin Counties		Knight City					October 24, 2018		https://www.yourcommunityfoundation.org/onthetable
