= Institute for America's Future =

American non-profit organization

- Merged into: People's Action Institute
- Founder: Robert L. Borosage, Roger Hickey
- Type: 501(c)(3)
- Location: Washington D.C.
- Website: www.ourfuture.org

Institute for America's Future was a progressive American think tank. The institute, a 501(c)(3) non-profit organization, has a sister organization called Campaign for America's Future which is a 501(c)(4) non-profit organization.

== Activities ==
The Institute funded a website, TomPaine.com, which offers news, opinion and policy analysis from a progressive perspective.

The Institute established a joint project with the Center on Wisconsin Strategy called the Apollo Alliance, which is a 501(c)(3) think tank that deals with energy issues.
