= High Road Strategy Center =

Progressive Policy institute

Coordinates: 43.0763°N 89.4053°W

- Founder: Joel Rogers
- Established: 1991
- Mission: Advance progressive public policy solutions
- Formerly called: Center on Wisconsin Strategy (COWS)
- Location: University of Wisconsin–Madison, Madison, Wisconsin, United States
- Website: highroad.wisc.edu

The High Road Strategy Center, formerly the Center on Wisconsin Strategy (COWS), is a progressive policy institute housed on the campus of the University of Wisconsin–Madison. It was founded in 1991 by UW Professor Joel Rogers. The organization says that its core values are democracy, sustainability and equality.

== Activities ==
The earliest efforts of COWS were directed at workforce development in Wisconsin and rust-belt states that were losing manufacturing jobs. Since 1996, the center has published a biennial report, The State of Working Wisconsin, that quantifies and analyzes trends in that state's workforce. COWS supports raising the minimum wage. The organization has worked with the Service Employees International Union, Wisconsin Jobs Now and the Economic Policy Institute on efforts to raise the minimum wage.

The focus of COWS has expanded to include a number of separate projects aimed at government leaders across the nation who can affect policy in their regions. With Madison Mayor Dave Cieslewicz, COWS co-founded the Mayors Innovation Project. It later added the Center for State Innovation. Both projects are aimed at helping elected officials pursue progressive policies.

COWS also helped launch organizations like the Apollo Alliance and the Economic Analysis Research Network (EARN). In 2012 it started the American Legislative and Issue Campaign (ALICE) to write and promote model legislation from a progressive perspective. ALICE was intended to serve as a progressive counterpoint to the American Legislative Exchange Council (ALEC).

== Funding ==
COWS is mainly supported by government grants and foundations. It has received funding from the Alfred P. Sloan Foundation, the Annie E. Casey Foundation, the Carnegie Corporation of New York, the Carolyn Foundation, the Ford Foundation, the Garfield Foundation, Living Cities, the Joyce Foundation, the Nathan Cummings Foundation, the Open Society Institute, the Rockefeller Foundation, the Surdna Foundation, the Wallace Global Fund and the Wisconsin Department of Workforce Development. It receives formal support from the university in the form of tax status and from non-university government grants.
