= Joel Rogers =

American academic and political activist

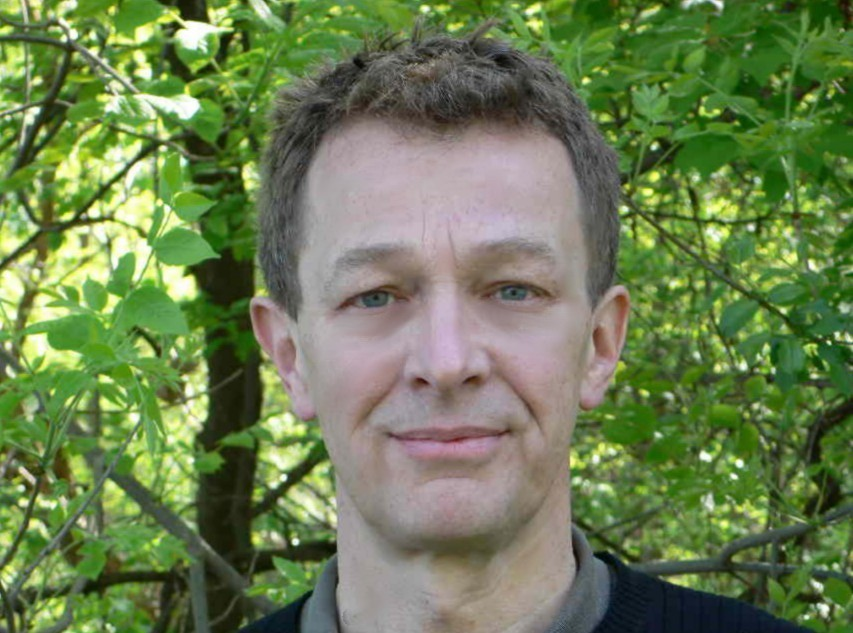
- Rogers in 2006
- Born: Joel Edwards Rogers
- Education: Yale University (BA, JD); Princeton University (MA, PhD)
- Occupation: Professor

Joel Edwards Rogers is an American academic and political activist. Currently a professor of law, political science, public affairs and sociology at the University of Wisconsin–Madison, he also directs the Center on Wisconsin Strategy and its projects, including the Center for State Innovation, Mayors Innovation Project, and State Smart Transportation Initiative. Rogers is a contributing editor of The Nation.

Rogers has written widely on American politics and public policy, political theory, labor relations, and economic development and has helped found and run many progressive organizations. In 1997, in Timmons v. Twin Cities Area New Party, the U.S. Supreme Court ruled 6–3 against his attempt to declare state prohibitions on "fusion" or "plural nomination"—in which a candidate may be nominated by more than one party—unconstitutional. A MacArthur Foundation "genius" fellow, he has been identified by Newsweek as one of 100 Americans most likely to affect U.S. politics and culture in the 21st century.

== Books ==
- Rogers, Joel; Cohen, Joshua (1983). On democracy. Middlesex, England: Penguin Books. ISBN 9780140067811.
- Rogers, Joel; Cohen, Joshua (1986). Inequity and intervention: The Federal Budget and Central America. Boston: South End Press. ISBN 9780896083257.
- Ferguson, Thomas; Rogers, Joel (1988). Right turn: The Decline of the Democrats and the future of American Politics (3. print. ed.). New York: Hill and Wang. ISBN 0809001705.
- Rogers, Joel; Cohen, Joshua (1986). Rules of the game. Boston: South End Press. ISBN 9780896083264.
- Rogers, Joel; Cohen, Joshua (1995). Associations and democracy. The Real Utopias Project. London: Verso Books. ISBN 1859849288. with Paul Q. Hirst, Claus Offe, Jane Mansbridge, Andrew Szasz, Andrew Levine, Philippe C. Schmitte, Wolfgang Streeck, Ira Katznelson, Ellen M. Immergut, Iris Marion Young, and Heinz Klug.
- Rogers, Joel; Cohen, Joshua (1999). The new inequality. Boston: Beacon Press.
- Rogers, Joel; Erik Olin Wright (2015). American Society: How It Really Works. New York: W.W. Norton & Company.
