= Joshua Cohen (philosopher) =

American philosopher

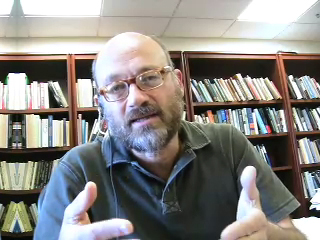
- Born: 1951 (age 74–75)
- Occupations: Political philosopher and professor at Stanford University; faculty, Apple University; co-editor of the Boston Review; author of many books; frequent guest on BloggingHeads.tv

Academic background
- Education: Yale University; Harvard University (PhD)
- Doctoral advisor: John Rawls

Joshua Cohen (/ˈkoʊən/ KOH-ən; born 1951) is an American philosopher specializing in political philosophy. He has taught at Stanford University and Massachusetts Institute of Technology (MIT) and is currently a member of the faculty at Apple University and the University of California, Berkeley.

== Education and career ==
Cohen earned B.A. and M.A. degrees in philosophy from Yale University in 1973, and earned his Ph.D. at Harvard University under the direction of John Rawls in 1979. He taught at MIT from 1979 until 2007, when he moved to Stanford University. At Stanford, he was Marta Sutton Weeks Professor of Ethics in Society (2008–2014) and professor of political science, philosophy, and law (2006–2014) At Stanford, Cohen was also one of the program leaders (along with Larry Diamond and Terry Winograd) for the Program on Liberation Technologies at Stanford's Freeman Spogli Institute for International Studies. Cohen became part of the faculty of Apple University in 2011, joining full-time on October 15, 2014 and resigning from Stanford. He also spends one day a week running a law and philosophy workshop series at the University of California, Berkeley.

He has published articles and books in political philosophy, including deliberative democracy, and global justice, as well as such topics as freedom of expression, electoral finance, and new models of democratic governance. His 2012 Comte Lectures at the London School of Economics discussed the issues he teaches about: mobile for development and human-centered design.

Since 1991, Cohen has served as editor of Boston Review, with Deb Chasman joining as coeditor in 2002.

== Books ==
- Cohen, Joshua; Rogers, Joel (1983). On Democracy. Middlesex, England: Penguin Books.
- Cohen, Joshua; Rogers, Joel (1986). Inequity and Intervention: The Federal Budget and Central America. Boston: South End Press.
- Cohen, Joshua; Rogers, Joel (1986). Rules of the Game. Boston: South End Press.
- Cohen, Joshua; Rogers, Joel (1995). Associations and Democracy. The Real Utopias Project. London: Verso Books. ISBN 1859849288. with Paul Q. Hirst, Claus Offe, Jane Mansbridge, Andrew Szasz, Andrew Levine, Philippe C. Schmitte, Wolfgang Streeck, Ira Katznelson, Ellen M. Immergut, Iris Marion Young, and Heinz Klug.
- Cohen, Joshua; Rogers, Joel (1999). The New Inequality. Boston: Beacon Press.
- Cohen, Joshua; Okin, Susan Moller; Nussbaum, Martha; Howard, Matthew (1999). Is Multiculturalism Bad for Women?. Princeton, New Jersey: Princeton University Press. ISBN 9780691004327. Originally an essay (pdf).
- Cohen, Joshua; Shanley, Mary Lyndon; Chasman, Deborah (2004). Just Marriage. Oxford UK New York: Oxford University Press. ISBN 9780195176261.
- Cohen, Joshua (2009). Philosophy, Politics, Democracy: Selected Papers. Cambridge: Harvard University Press.
- Cohen, Joshua (2010). The Arc of the Moral Universe and Other Papers. Cambridge: Harvard University Press.
- Cohen, Joshua (2011). Rousseau: A Free Community of Equals. New York: Oxford University Press.

== See also ==
- American philosophy
- List of American philosophers
