= Roemer model of political competition =

The Roemer model of political competition is a game between political parties in which each party announces a multidimensional policy vector. Since Nash equilibria do not normally exist when the policy space is multidimensional, John Roemer introduced the concept of party-unanimity Nash equilibrium (PUNE), which can be considered an application of the concept of Nash equilibrium to political competition. It is also a generalization of the Wittman model of political competition.

In Roemer's model, all political parties are assumed to consist of three types of factions—opportunists, militants, and reformers. Opportunists seek solely to maximize the party's vote share in an election; militants seek to announce (and implement) the preferred policy of the average party member; and reformers pursue a compromise between the aims of opportunists and militants, combining concerns for electoral success with fidelity to the party’s ideological preferences. It has been shown that the existence of reformers has no effect on what policies the party announces.

With two parties, a pair of policy announcements constitute a PUNE if and only if the reformers and militants of any given party do not unanimously agree to deviate from their announced policy, given the policy put forth by the other party. In other words, if a pair of policies constitute a PUNE, then it should not be the case that both factions of a party can be made weakly better off (and one faction strictly better off) by deviating from the policy that they put forward. Such unanimity to deviate can be rare, and thus PUNEs are more likely to exist than regular Nash equilibria.

== Existence of PUNEs ==
Although there are no known cases where PUNEs do not exist, no simple necessary and sufficient conditions for the existence of non-trivial PUNEs (i.e., in which no party offers the ideal policy of either its militants or opportunists) have yet been offered. The question of the existence of non-trivial PUNEs remains an important open question in the theory of political competition.

== See also ==
- Electoral competition
- Investment theory of party competition
