= Apple University =

Corporate university of Apple in California, United States

Coordinates: 37.33182°N 122.03118°W

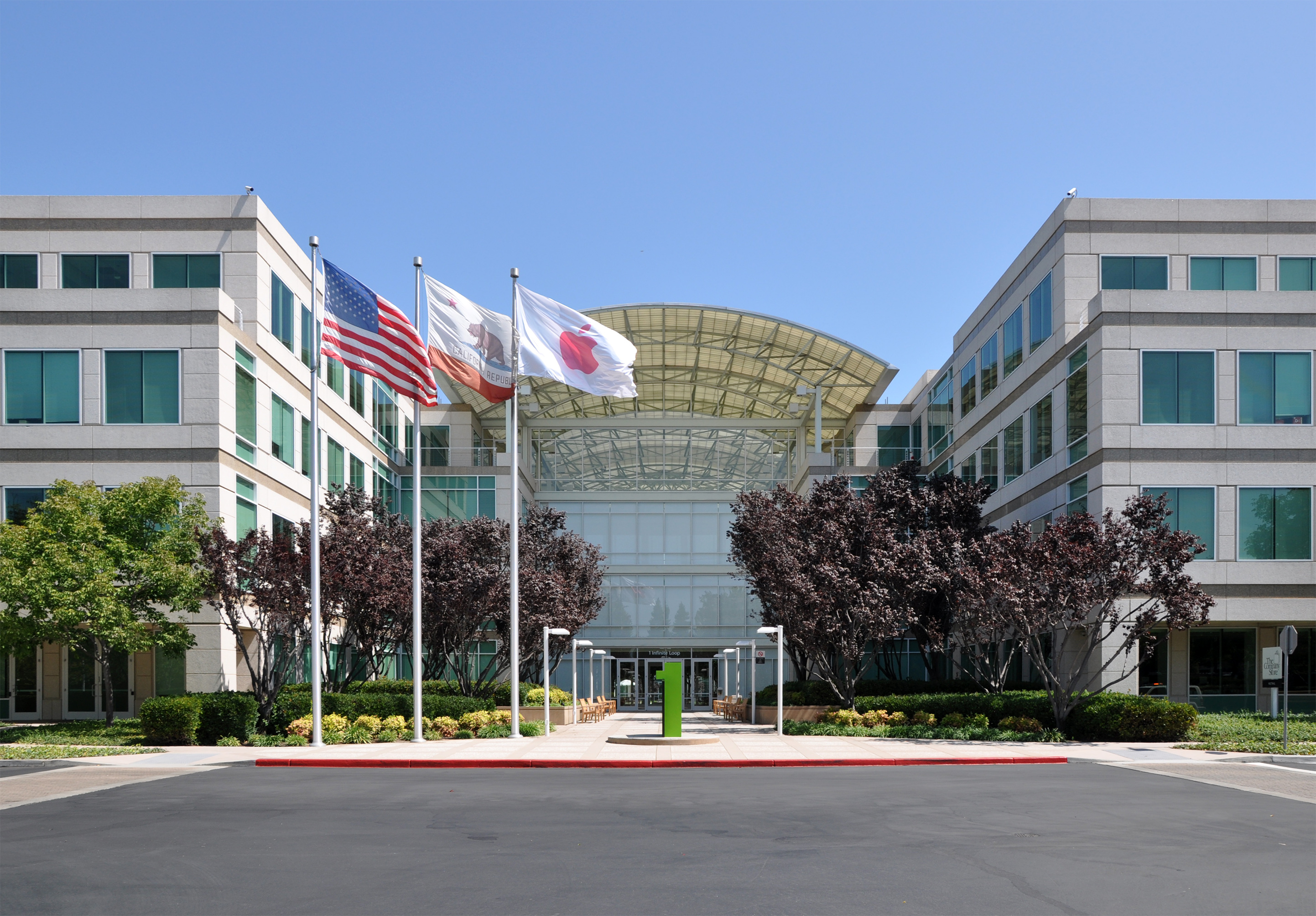
- Apple Campus (1 Infinite Loop, Cupertino, California)
- Type: Corporate university
- Established: 2008
- Affiliations: Apple
- Chairman: Richard M. Locke, Dean
- Head: Richard M. Locke
- Location: Cupertino, California, US
- Campus: Suburban

Apple University is a training facility of Apple, located in Cupertino, California. This corporate university was designed to instruct personnel employed by Apple in the various aspects of Apple's technology and corporate culture.

== History ==
Steve Jobs established Apple University in 2008 as a way to inculcate employees into Apple's business culture and educate them about its history, particularly as the company grew. The program was devised by Joel Podolny, then the Dean of Yale School of Management. Jobs selected him when the program was founded, and Podolny was head of the program and effectively dean of the university until 2021. He also was a vice president at Apple.

Courses are not required, only recommended. Employees sign up for courses tailored to their positions and backgrounds on an internal website available only to Apple staff members.

It is highly secretive and rarely written about. Employees are strongly discouraged from talking about the company in general, including Apple University. No pictures of the classrooms have surfaced publicly.

Apple has strenuously pursued the vision that function and beauty come from simplicity, and teachers in its internal training program sometimes point to a series of Picasso lithographs that illustrate the drive to boil down ideas to their most essential components.

== Academic staff and instructors ==
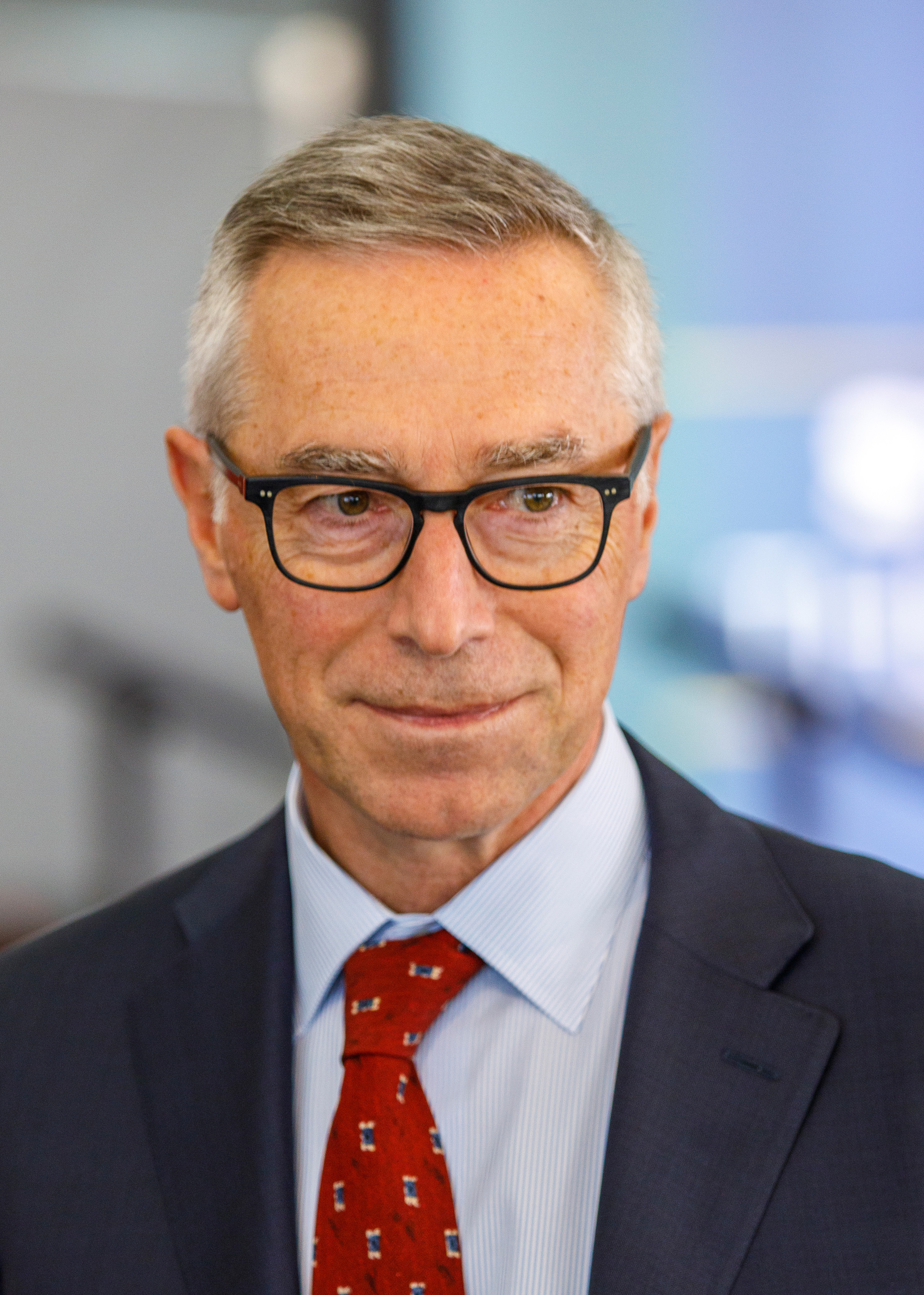
Dean Richard M. Locke

The full-time members of the faculty design and teach the courses. Faculty members include professors from universities like Yale; Harvard; the University of California-Berkeley; Stanford; and M.I.T. Some faculties continue to hold positions at their universities while also working for Apple.

The instructors include:

- Tim Cook, former CEO
- Joel Podolny, formerly the dean of Yale School of Management
- Richard Tedlow, a Harvard University business historian
- Randy Nelson who came from the animation studios Pixar and DreamWorks Animation
- Joshua Cohen, a Berkeley professor
- Morten Hansen, of Berkeley
- Noelle Stout, a Stanford professor

== Courses ==
Some courses teach case studies about important business decisions that Apple made. These strategic decisions include the one to make the iPod and its iTunes software compatible with Microsoft's Windows system. This was a topic of fierce debate internally at Apple, with Steve Jobs strongly opposing the notion of sharing the iPod with Windows. Jobs eventually gave in to his lieutenants. It turned out that opening the iPod to Windows users led to explosive growth of the music player and the iTunes Store, and this in turn would later be critical to the success of the iPhone.

“Communicating at Apple.” This course focuses on clear communication for making products intuitive, sharing ideas within Apple, and marketing products.

“Project Management.” No information provided. Course is confidential.

“Vendor Management.”

“What Makes Apple, Apple.” Focuses on one of Jobs's goals: to make complex computer technologies feel understandable and natural. In the course, an instructor showed a slide of the remote control for the Google TV. The remote had 78 buttons. Then the instructor, Nelson, showed a photo of the Apple TV remote, a thin rod with three buttons.

== Campus ==
The classes are taught on Apple's corporate campus in Cupertino, California. Apple University is in a section of buildings called City Center. The rooms are built in a trapezoid shape. Occasionally, classes are offered in Apple's offices overseas, and the professors travel there to teach.

In 2014, Apple planned an expansion of Apple University to China, to include a Dean to run Apple University China.

== See also ==
- Hamburger University
- Disney University
