= Morten Hansen =

Norwegian-American professor

Morten T. Hansen
- Born: 1963 (age 62–63); Norway
- Education: Stanford University (PhD); London School of Economics (MSc); Middlebury Institute of International Studies (MPA); University of Oslo (BA)
- Occupations: Professor; Management Theorist; Author; Speaker
- Spouse: Helene Hansen
- Children: 2
- Website: www.mortenhansen.com

Morten T. Hansen is a Norwegian-American professor, management theorist, motivational speaker and author.

== Biography ==
Hansen obtained his BA in political science from the University of Oslo in Norway. He received his Master of Public Administration from the Middlebury Institute of International Studies at Monterey. His MSc in accounting and finance was obtained at the London School of Economics. He earned a Ph.D. in business administration, with a focus on organizational behavior, from the Stanford Graduate School of Business, where he was a Fulbright scholar and received the Jaedicke award for outstanding academic performance.

Hansen is a full tenured management professor in the School of Information at the University of California, Berkeley, and is also a faculty member at Apple University. He was formerly a professor in entrepreneurship at INSEAD, France where he held the André and Rosalie Hoffmann Chair, and an associate professor at the Harvard Business School.

Hansen also worked for the Boston Consulting Group where he was a senior consultant for the London and Stockholm offices and was part of the founding team of BCG Nordics. He worked later as a manager in the San Francisco office.

Hansen is the son of Egill and Lise Hansen. He lives in the San Francisco Bay area with his wife, Helene Hansen, and their two children.

== Works ==
Hansen's research focuses on social networks, collaboration, knowledge management, and corporate innovation and has been published in leading academic journals, including Administrative Science Quarterly, Management Science, Strategic Management Journal, and Academy of Management Journal. In recognition of his work, he received the 2005 Administrative Science Quarterly award for having made exceptional contributions to the field of organization studies.

Hansen has published numerous articles in Harvard Business Review and in Sloan Management Review. Together with co-author and Harvard Business School dean Nitin Norhia, he is the winner of the 2005 Sloan Management Review/Pricewaterhouse Coopers Award for the management article that contributed most significantly to the enhancement of management practice.

== Books ==
Hansen has authored or co-authored three books:

- Great at Work: How Top Performers Do Less, Work Better and Achieve More (2018). Wall Street Journal bestseller.
- Great by Choice: Uncertainty, Chaos and Luck-Why Some Thrive Despite Them All (2011), co-authored with Jim Collins. New York Times and Wall Street Journal bestseller. James A. Hamilton Book of the Year Award in 2013.
- Collaboration: How Leaders Avoid the Traps, Create Unity, and Reap Big Results Finalist (2009). George R. Terry Book Award
