= Electoral competition =

Competition between political parties or candidates

Political competition is defined as one minus the share of votes received by the largest party.

Political competition is one minus the share of the winning party's votes in a national election. It provides a measure of the winning party's dominance in the election.

Electoral competition, political competition or electoral competitiveness refers to the degree of competition in electoral politics between candidates or political parties. The most common measures are based on the observed margin of victory, while probability-based approaches can account for uncertainty about both election results and subsequent government formation to construct measures that are also applicable to multiparty systems. A separate group of measures, such as those in the Polity data series, focuses on the institutional conditions for political competition, including the extent to which opposition groups can organize and compete for power.

== Roemer model of political competition ==
The Roemer model of political competition is a game between political parties in which each party announces a multidimensional policy vector. Since Nash equilibria do not normally exist when the policy space is multidimensional, John Roemer introduced the concept of party-unanimity Nash equilibrium (PUNE), which can be considered an application of the concept of Nash equilibrium to political competition. It is also a generalization of the Wittman model of political competition.

== Effect on corruption ==
Political competitiveness can affect the level of political corruption. Studies have found that: "Greater electoral competition serves to lessen policy distortions. However, this in turn stimulates more intense lobbying which increases the scope of corrupt behavior. It is shown that electoral competition merely serves to alter the type of corruption that eventuates, but cannot eliminate it."

== By country ==
=== United States ===
As of 1984, in American federal elections, races for U.S. Senate tended to be more competitive than those for U.S. House of Representatives. In the 21st century, competition in elections has disappeared; even in wave election years, the vast majority of U.S. House members have been keeping their seats, with little pressure from the opposing party. Competition in U.S. House races has been in decline since at least the 1960s.

In February 2025, The New York Times spoke of the death of competition in elections, which "were decided by low-turnout" of just 57,000 people voting for politicians in U.S. House primary elections rendering these "meaningless". Also, more than three-quarters of primary races in 2024 were uncontested and only 287 of more than 4,600 primaries were "meaningful". This has contributed to eroding trust in government. Apart from gerrymandering in the United States, there has been an aggregation of like-minded voters, because they have moved into the same neighborhoods and communities.

== See also ==
- Effective number of parties
- Investment theory of party competition
- Median voter theorem
- Marketplace of ideas
- Nomination rules
- Lesser of two evils principle
