= Corporate university =

Form of business training and education

A corporate university (CU) is any educational entity that is a strategic tool designed to assist its parent organization in achieving its mission by conducting activities that cultivate individual and organizational learning, knowledge, and wisdom. Perhaps the best-known corporate university is Hamburger University operated by McDonald's Corporation in Chicago. CUs are a growing trend in corporations. In 1993, corporate universities existed in only 400 companies. By 2001, this number had increased to 2,000, including Walt Disney, Boeing, and Motorola.

== Overview ==
In most cases, corporate universities are not universities in the strict sense of the word. The traditional university is an educational institution which grants both undergraduate and postgraduate degrees in a variety of subjects, as well as conducting original scientific research. In contrast, a corporate university typically limits scope to providing job-specific, indeed company-specific, training for the managerial personnel of the parent corporation. The scope of the CU depends on the corporate strategy, consequently maintaining a strategic alignment between the CU and the parent organisation belong to the key success factors of a CU implementation. Corporate universities are most commonly found in the United States, a nation which has no official legal definition of the term "university".

The term "corporate university" may also refer to public universities which have developed, or have been forced by states to develop, corporate style behaviour.

== Purpose ==
Corporate universities are set up for a variety of reasons, but most organizations have the same basic needs. These are to:

- Bring a common culture, loyalty, and belonging to a company
- Get the most out of the investment in education
- Organize training
- Remain competitive in today's economy
- Retain employees
- Start and support change in the organization

CUs offer valuable training and education to employees, but they also help organizations retain and promote key employees. Although a CU may sound attractive, there is a lot of work that goes into the planning and implementation of such a project.

== Curriculum ==
J.P. Morgan and Co. is an example of a company with an organized curriculum. They have three different types of courses: Business specific courses, organizational learning and communication classes, and management and executive training.

Most CUs offer a blended curriculum of online and in person classes. Some organizations offer courses during the workday, while other offer them at varying times. Courses can be short workshops or longer, more traditional courses.

Unlike traditional universities, CUs demand a return on their investment. There must be concrete evidence that the classroom is delivering results. Many CUs provide hands-on and team learning as a more effective alternative to lecture-based courses, but all CUs agree that what is learned in the classroom should be directly applicable to the work environment.

== Implementation ==
Although a CU may sound attractive, there is a lot of work that goes into the planning and implementation of such a project, such as complex logistics, resource optimization and careful budgeting. Indeed, corporate universities tend to be cost centers with dedicated training facilities servicing an often global workforce through a dedicated curriculum. To manage this complexity, specific Enterprise resource planning systems have been developed for Corporate Universities, such as a Training management system. Other systems such as accounting systems and different types of learning technologies can be used together.

== See also ==
- Apple University
- Hamburger University
- Disney University
- Defense Acquisition University
