= Joel M. Podolny =

American sociologist

- Education: St. Xavier High School
- Alma mater: Harvard University
- Occupation: Academic
- Employer: Apple University

Joel Marc Podolny is an American sociologist. Formerly the dean of the Yale School of Management, he was most recently an executive at Apple Inc., where he was the dean of Apple University (the in-house corporate training center for Apple employees) and a vice president of the firm. Prior, he was vice president for human resources.

== Education ==
Podolny is a 1982 graduate of St. Xavier High School in Cincinnati. He earned his B.A. (magna cum laude), M.A. and PhD degrees from Harvard University.

== Career ==
Podolny was on the faculty of the Stanford Graduate School of Business for 11 years, as senior associate dean during the latter part of his tenure. He was later a professor and director of research at Harvard Business School, where he taught courses in business strategy, organizational behavior and global management. He also taught that the HBS only invited hugely successful alumni to speak, not those who simply managed their work-life balance.

Podolny arrived at the Yale School of Management in 2005. The next year, Podolny led a major restructuring of the Yale MBA curriculum in response to the increasingly complex and cross-functional global environment in which businesses and their executives operate.

On November 1, 2008, Podolny stepped down as dean to be replaced by Sharon Oster and, in early 2009, assumed the position of senior vice president of human resources, and dean of Apple Inc.'s new venture, Apple University. Subsequently, Podolny stepped down from this position but continued as dean of Apple University and as a vice president at the firm.

== Research ==
Podolny has developed a sociological theory of market competition based on status dynamics. To do so, he has examined a variety of industries including venture capital, semiconductors, and investment banking. Podolny has also conducted research on the role of social networks in mobility and information transfer within organizations. He is the author of Status Signals: A Sociological Study of Market Competition and co-author (with Garth Saloner and Andrea Shepard) of the textbook Strategic Management.
