= Richard M. Locke =

American political scientist (born 1959)

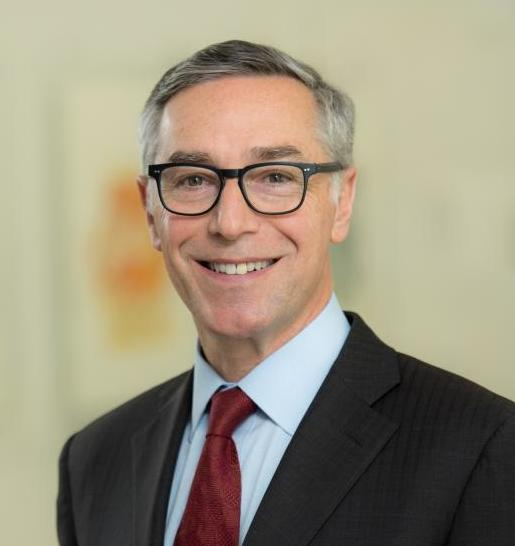

Provost of Brown University
- In office 2015–2022

Personal details
- Born: April 22, 1959 (age 66) Boston, Massachusetts, U.S.
- Spouse: Zairo Cheibub (2014-present) Jessica Barton (divorced)
- Education: Wesleyan University; University of Chicago; MIT

Richard Michael Locke (born April 22, 1959) was the former dean of Apple University, and is the current dean of the MIT Sloan School of Management. Locke joined Apple after serving as the 13th provost of Brown University. He served as provost for 7.5 years, one of the longest serving provosts of Brown University.

== Biography ==
The second of four children of Franca Franzaroli, Locke is a 1981 graduate of Wesleyan University and holds a PhD in political science from the Massachusetts Institute of Technology, as well as a master's degree in education from the University of Chicago. He served as chair of MIT's Political Science Department and deputy dean in the MIT Sloan School of Management.

Locke was named the Schreiber Family Professor of Political Science and International and Public Affairs at Brown University in January 2018.

Locke currently serves as a member of the Council on Foreign Relations, and the International Labour Organization (ILO) and the International Finance Corporation (IFC) Better Work Program Advisory Committee. He has also served as chair of the Academic Advisory Board at Apple Inc.

For his research on fair and safe working conditions in global supply chains, Locke was awarded with an inaugural Progress Medal for Scholarship and Leadership on Fairness and Well-being by the Society for Progress in 2016.

Locke left his position at Brown in December 2022 to become vice president and dean of Apple University.

In 2014, Locke married his MIT classmate, Zairo Cheibub.

== Selected publications ==
- "Remaking the Italian Economy". Cornell University Press. 1995.
- "Production in the Innovation Economy". MIT Press. 2014.
- "The Promise and Limits of Private Power". Cambridge University Press. 2013.
- "Does Monitoring Improve Labor Standards? Lessons from Nike". IRL Review. 2007.
- "Working in America". MIT Press. 2001.
- "Employment Relations in a Changing World Economy". MIT Press. 1995.
