= Hegemony or Survival =

2003 book by Noam Chomsky

Hegemony or Survival: America's Quest for Global Dominance
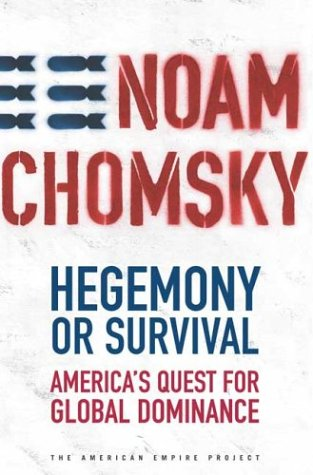
- First edition cover
- Author: Noam Chomsky
- Publisher: Metropolitan Books, Haymarket Books
- Publication date: November 2003, January 2024
- Media type: Print (Paperback)
- Pages: 304
- ISBN: 9798888901458
- OCLC: 52798943
- Dewey Decimal: 327.73/009/0511 22
- LC Class: E902.C47 2003

Hegemony or Survival: America's Quest for Global Dominance is a book about the United States and its foreign policy written by American political activist and linguist Noam Chomsky. It was first published in the United States in November 2003 by Metropolitan Books and then in the United Kingdom by Penguin Books. It was republished by Haymarket Books in January 2024.

Chomsky's main argument in Hegemony or Survival is that the socio-economic elite who control the United States have pursued an "Imperial Grand Strategy" since the end of World War II to maintain global hegemony through military, political, and economic means. He argues that in doing so they have repeatedly shown a total disregard for democracy and human rights, in stark contrast to the US government's professed support for those values. He further argues that this continual pursuit of global hegemony threatens the existence of humanity itself because of the increasing proliferation of weapons of mass destruction.

Drawing historical examples from 1945 through to 2003, Chomsky looks at the US government's support for regimes responsible for mass human rights abuses—including ethnic cleansing and genocide—namely El Salvador, Colombia, Turkey, Israel, Egypt, South Africa, and Indonesia. He also discusses US support for militant dissident groups widely considered "terrorists", particularly in Nicaragua and Cuba, as well as direct military interventions, such as the Vietnam War, NATO bombing of Yugoslavia, Afghan War and Iraq War, to further its power and grasp of resources. He argues that US foreign policy—whether controlled by Republican or Democratic administrations—pursues the same agenda of gaining access to lucrative resources and maintaining US world dominance.

Mainstream press reviews in the US were mixed and were largely negative in the UK, although a review in Asia was more positive. In a speech before the UN General Assembly in September 2006, Venezuelan President Hugo Chávez openly praised the work. Sales of the book surged after the recommendation, its rank on Amazon.com rising to No. 1 in paperback and No. 6 in hardcover in only a few days.

== Background ==
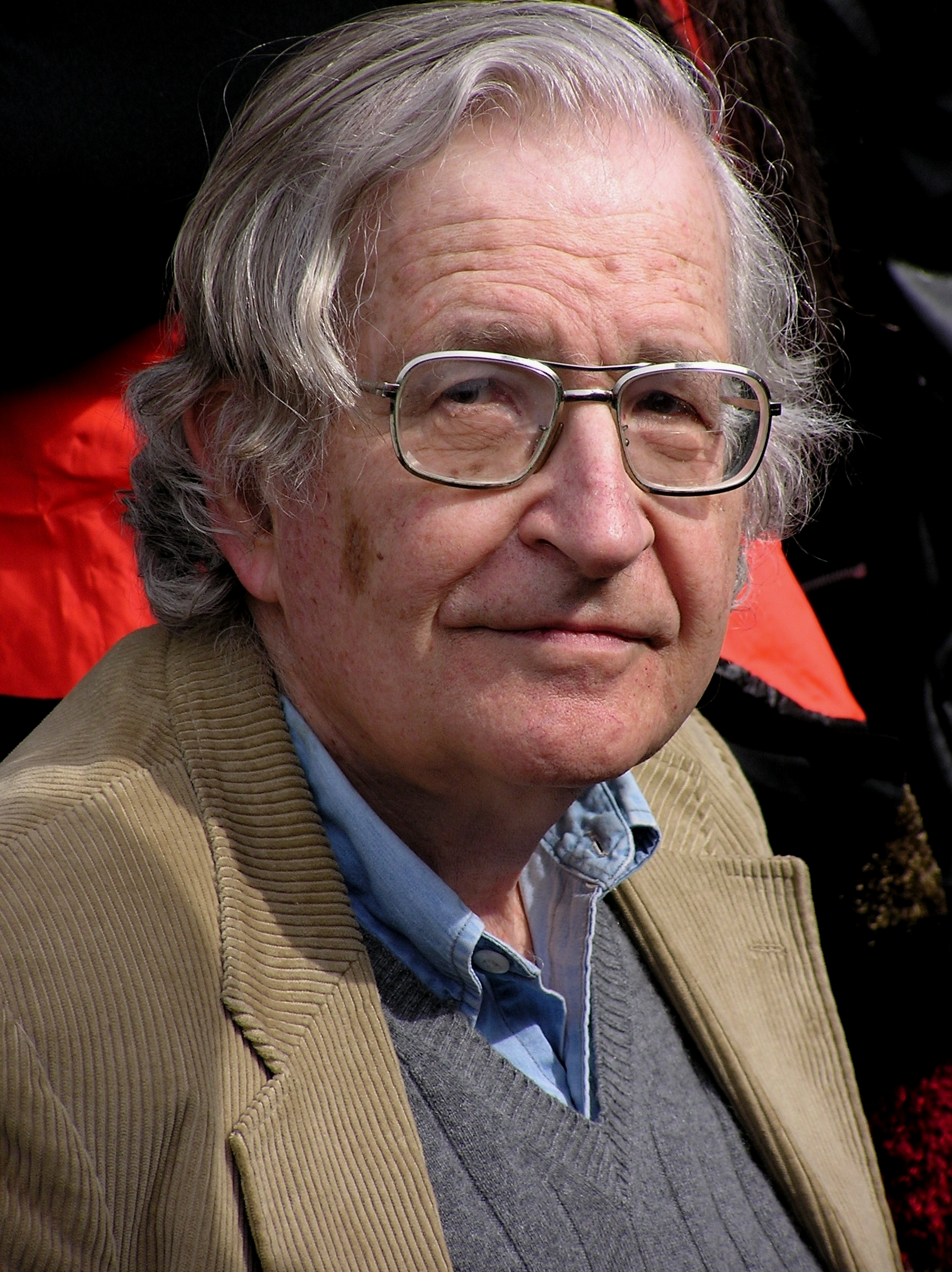
Chomsky in 2004

Noam Chomsky (born 1928) was born in Philadelphia, Pennsylvania, to Jewish immigrants from Eastern Europe. Becoming academically involved in the field of linguistics, Chomsky gained a PhD and secured a teaching job at the Massachusetts Institute of Technology. In the field of linguistics, he is credited as the creator or co-creator of the Chomsky hierarchy and the universal grammar theory, achieving international recognition for his work.

Politically, Chomsky had held radical leftist views since childhood, identifying himself with anarcho-syndicalism and libertarian socialism. A staunch critic of U.S. foreign policy, he arose to public attention for these views in 1967, when The New York Times published his article, "The Responsibility of Intellectuals", a criticism of the Vietnam War. His media criticism has included Manufacturing Consent: The Political Economy of the Mass Media (1988), co-written with Edward S. Herman, an analysis articulating the propaganda model theory for examining the media.

Chomsky is the author of over 100 books, and has been described as a prominent cultural figure. According to the Arts and Humanities Citation Index in 1992, Chomsky was cited as a source more often than any other living scholar from 1980 to 1992, and was the eighth most cited source overall. (Note: "According to a recent survey by the Institute for Scientific Information, only Marx, Lenin, Shakespeare, Aristotle, the Bible, Plato, and Freud are cited more often in academic journals than Chomsky, who edges out Hegel and Cicero." (Hughes 2001)) (Note: "Judged in terms of the power, range, novelty and influence of his thought, Noam Chomsky is arguably the most important intellectual alive today. He is also a disturbingly divided intellectual." (Robinson 1979))

The book was published as the first in The American Empire Series, edited for Metropolitan Books by Steve Fraser and Tom Engelhardt. The series had been devised as a vehicle for works of anti-imperialism that were critical of U.S. foreign policy. Engelhardt informed an interviewer that the series reflected their "counterinterventionary impulse" and represented an attempt to reclaim "the word" from the political right in the United States. They agreed to publish with Metropolitan because it was co-run by Engelhardt and Sara Bershtel. In conjunction with the publication of the book, Chomsky answered a series of public questions on the website of The Washington Post.

== Synopsis ==
Chomsky's first chapter, "Priorities and Prospects", provides an introduction to U.S. global dominance at the start of 2003. He looks at the role of propaganda – employed by government and mass media – in shaping public opinion in both the U.S. and United Kingdom, arguing that it allows a wealthy elite to thrive at the expense of the majority. As evidence for the manner in which the media shapes public opinion on foreign policy, he discusses the role of the U.S. government in protecting its economic interests in Nicaragua, first by supporting the military junta of General Somoza and then by supporting the Contra militias, in both instances leading to mass human rights abuses which were ignored by the mainstream U.S. media.

Chapter two, "Imperial Grand Strategy", looks at the U.S. government's belief that it should take part in "preventative war" against states who threaten its global hegemony, despite the illegality of these actions under international law. Chomsky argues that the targets of U.S. preventative war must be weak, yet important and easy to depict as a threat to the U.S. populace. Using the 2003 invasion of Iraq as an example, he discusses how the U.S. government and media portrayed the Iraqi government of Saddam Hussein as a threat to the U.S. and other Middle Eastern states, something which Chomsky argues it was not.

Chapter three, "The New Era of Enlightenment", explores further examples of U.S. interventionism in world affairs. Criticising the standard U.S. government claim that such interventionism is for humanitarian purposes, Chomsky maintains that it is an attempt to further the power of U.S. capitalism, with little interest in the welfare of the people involved. Using the 1999 NATO intervention in Kosovo as an example, he argues that western forces intervened not to protect Albanian Kosovans from Serbian aggression (as they claimed), but to humiliate and weaken Serbian President Slobodan Milošević, who had remained resistant to western demands for years. He asserts that western criticism of foreign human rights abuses is politically motivated, highlighting that while the U.S. were intervening in Kosovo, they were simultaneously supporting the governments of Turkey, Colombia and Indonesia, all of whom were involved in widespread human rights abuses and ethnic cleansing (see Kurdish–Turkish conflict (1978–present), Plan Colombia, 1999 East Timorese crisis, respectively).

In the fourth chapter, "Dangerous Times", Chomsky focuses primarily on U.S. interventionism throughout Latin America, which the government has defended through its Monroe Doctrine. He discusses the U.S. campaign to topple the socialist government of Fidel Castro in Cuba, highlighting both its economic embargo of the island and its financial backing for militant groups that attack Cuban targets, including the perpetrators of the Bay of Pigs invasion and the bombing of Cubana Flight 455. He furthermore discusses the U.S. government's role in training Latin American right wing paramilitary squads, who have perpetrated widespread human rights abuses across the region.

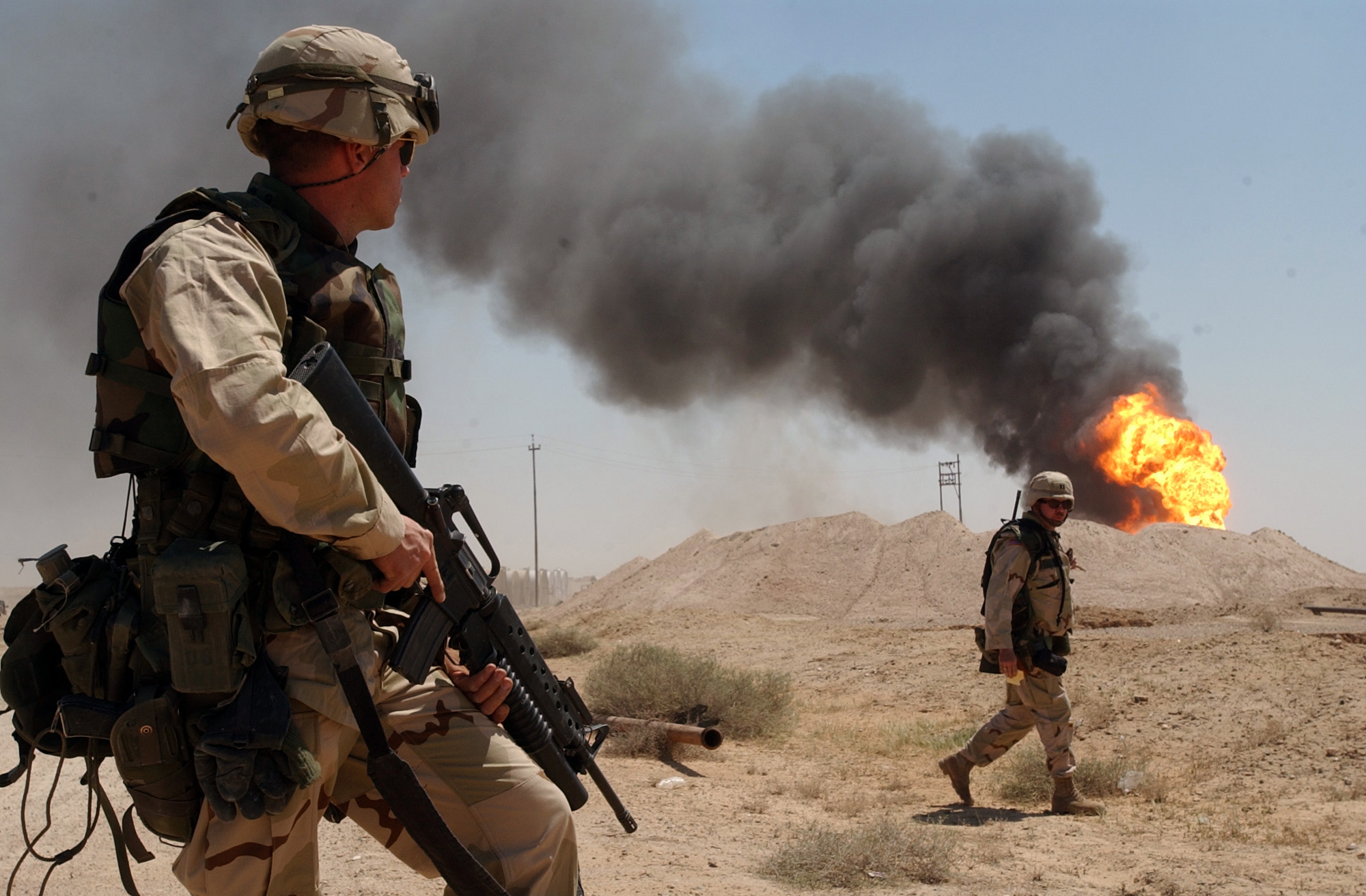
Chomsky considers the 2003 U.S.-U.K. invasion of Iraq – contravening international law and rejecting the opinions of the world's populace – as an attempt to secure lucrative natural resources and global hegemony.

Chapter five, "The Iraq Connection", looks at the background to the 2003 Iraq War, beginning with an analysis of the activities of the Reagan administration in the 1980s, who focused their military efforts in Central America and the Middle East. Chomsky argues that Reagan's administration utilized fear and nationalist rhetoric to distract the public from the poor economic situation that the U.S. was facing, finding scapegoats in the form of the leftist governments of Libya, Grenada and Nicaragua, as well as the international drug trade. He examines the long relationship that the U.S. had with the Hussein's Iraqi government, noting that they actively supported Hussein throughout the Iran–Iraq War, Al-Anfal Campaign and the Halabja poison gas attack, only turning against their former ally after his Invasion of Kuwait in 1990. Proceeding to critique the idea that the Bush II administration was genuinely concerned about threats to U.S. security, he criticises their attempts to undermine international efforts to prevent the militarization of space, the abolition of biological warfare, and the fight against global pollution, as well as the fact that they ignored all warnings that the Iraq invasion would cause a worldwide anti-American backlash. Exploring the dismissive attitude that the U.S. took towards European governments who opposed the war, namely France and Germany, he critiques the idea that the U.S. wanted to install a democratic government in Iraq, arguing that they wanted to install a puppet regime that would be obedient to U.S. corporate interests.

In the sixth chapter, "Dilemmas of Dominance", Chomsky explores the relationship that the U.S. has had with Eastern Europe since the collapse of the Soviet Union and with East Asia since the Second World War. In the former, Chomsky argues, the U.S. has allied itself with the capitalist reformers who have advocated privatization and neoliberalism at the expense of the welfare state, leading to increased poverty and demographic decline across the region. In the latter, he has explored the role that the U.S. has played – through the likes of the San Francisco Peace Treaty of 1951 – in supporting capitalist development, but trying to ensure its own economic hegemony at the same time.

Chapter seven, "Cauldron of Animosities", opens with a discussion of U.S. support for the increasing militarization of Israel and its illegal development of nuclear weapons, something Chomsky believes threatens peace in the Middle East by encouraging nations like Iran and Iraq to do the same. He explores the longstanding western exploitation of the Middle East for its oil resources, first by the British Empire and subsequently by the U.S. post-World War II, and then looks at the U.S.' role in the Israeli–Palestinian conflict, continually supporting Israel both militarily and politically, furthering human right abuses against the Palestinian people and repeatedly sabotaging the peace process.

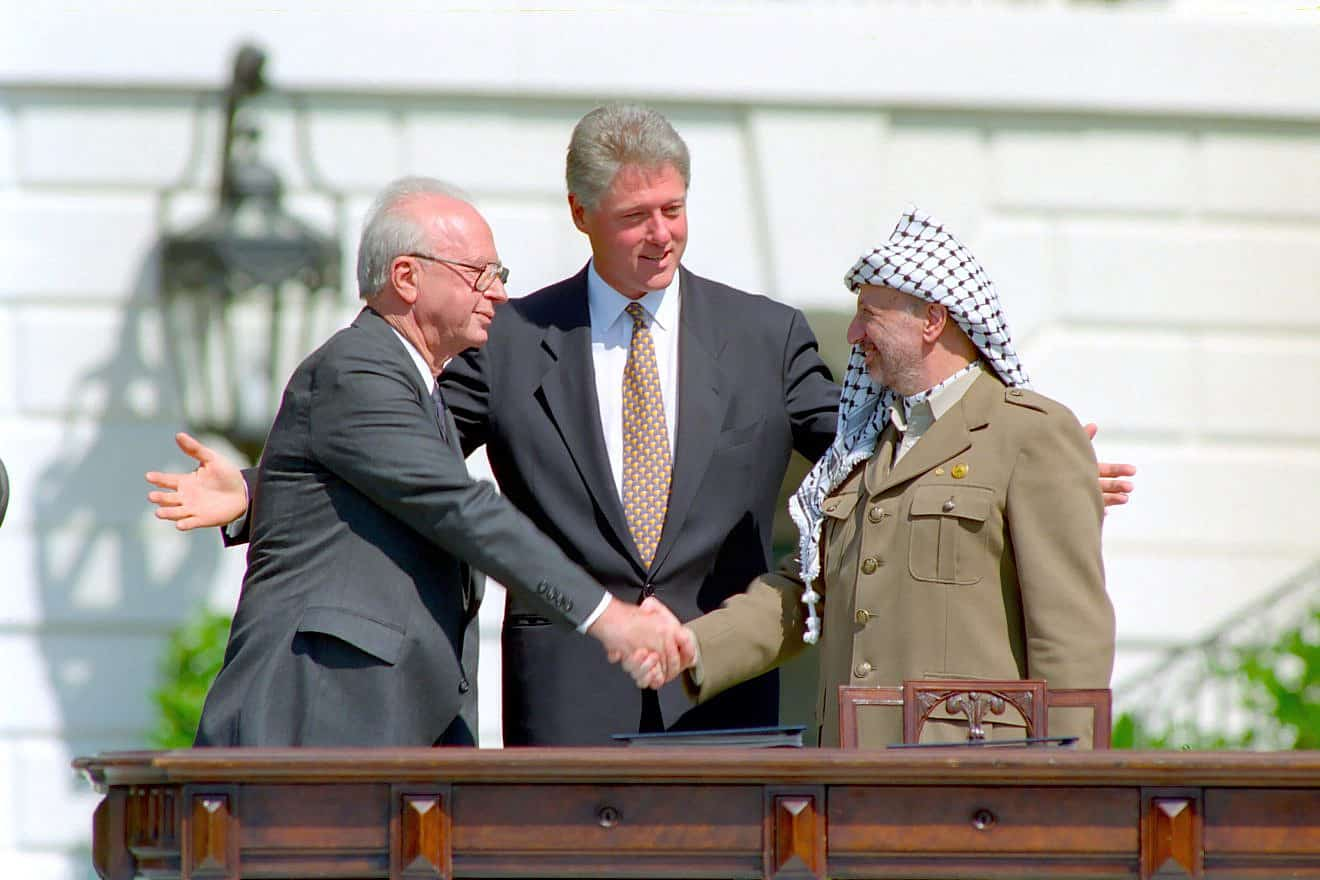
Chomsky argues that U.S. government attempts to solve the Israeli–Palestinian conflict, such as the 1994 Oslo Accords (shown here), have been a sham, continually favoring Israeli-U.S. interests. From left to right: Israeli Prime Minister Yitzhak Rabin, U.S. president Bill Clinton, and PLO chairman Yasser Arafat.

The eighth chapter, "Terrorism and Justice: Some Useful Truisms", looks at what Chomsky calls "a few simple truths" regarding the criteria that is accepted for a conflict to be internationally recognized as a "just war". He argues that these truisms are continually ignored when it comes to the actions of the U.S. and her allies. Exploring the concepts of "terror" and "terrorism", he argues that the U.S. only use the term to refer to the actions of their enemies, and never to their own actions, no matter how similar they may be. As an example of such double standards, he highlights the public outcry at the killing of Leon Klinghoffer, a disabled American murdered by Palestinian militants in 1985, contrasting it with the complete U.S. ignorance of the Israeli military's killing of a disabled Palestinian, Kemal Zughayer, in 2002. Focusing in on the Afghan War – widely described as a "just war" in the U.S. press – he criticizes such a description, arguing that the conflict was opposed by the majority of the world's population, including the Afghan people.

In the final chapter, "A Passing Nightmare", Chomsky turns his attention to weapons of mass destruction. He argues that rather than helping to eradicate nuclear, chemical and biological weaponry, the U.S. has continually increased its number of nuclear warheads, thereby encouraging other nations to do the same, putting the world in jeopardy of nuclear holocaust. Discussing the role of the U.S. in creating ballistic missile defense systems and encouraging the militarization of outer space, he notes that the U.S. government have continually undermined international treaties to decrease the number of weapons of mass destruction, because the American socio-economic elite believe that "hegemony is more important than survival." However, he argues that there is still hope for humanity if the citizens of the world – the "Second Superpower" – continue to criticize and oppose the actions of the U.S. government.

== Main arguments ==
=== U.S. Imperial Grand Strategy ===
Maintaining a hold on political power and enhancing US control of the world's primary energy sources are major steps toward the twin goals that have been declared with considerable clarity: to institutionalize a radical restructuring of domestic society that will roll back the progressive reforms of a century, and to establish an imperial grand strategy of permanent world domination.

— (Chomsky 2003, p. 125)

Chomsky's primary argument in Hegemony or Survival is that the United States government has pursued an "Imperial Grand Strategy" in order to maintain its status as the world's foremost superpower since at least the end of the Second World War. Adopting the term "Imperial Grand Strategy" from international affairs specialist John Ikenberry of Princeton University, he quotes Ikenberry on the nature of this doctrine and the manner in which it considers the "rule of force" to be more important than the "rule of law", thereby ignoring international law. Quoting liberal statesman Dean Acheson, Chomsky asserts that the purpose of this strategy is to prevent any challenge to the "power, position, and prestige of the United States".

Noting that economic decision making in the United States is highly centralized among a select socio-economic elite who control big business, he argues that this elite play a dominant role in this Imperial Grand Strategy because they consistently maintain a strong influence over successive U.S. governments. As a result, he argues that U.S. foreign policy has focused on gaining and maintaining unrestricted access to markets, energy supplies, and strategic resources across the world. Chomsky goes on to categorize the specific purposes of the doctrine as:

containing other centers of global power within the "overall framework of order" managed by the United States; maintaining control of the world's energy supplies; barring unacceptable forms of independent nationalism; and overcoming "crisis of democracy" within domestic enemy territory.

Chomsky argues that as a part of this strategy, the U.S. has regularly engaged in "preventative war", which he highlights is illegal under international law and could be categorised as a war crime. Preventative war refers to conflict waged to prevent a nation ever reaching the stage where it could become a potential threat, and according to Chomsky, under the regimes of Ronald Reagan, George H.W. Bush and his son George W. Bush it has actively involved attacking "an imagined or invented threat" such as Grenada and Iraq. He differentiates this "preventative war" from "preemptive war", which he argues can be justifiable under international law in cases of self-defence. Examining examples of preventative war waged by the United States, he notes that all of the nations that have been attacked have shared the same three characteristics: 1) they are "virtually defenseless", 2) they are "important enough to be worth the trouble" and 3) there has been a way to portray them as "the ultimate evil and an imminent threat to our survival."

=== The Bush administration and the invasion of Iraq ===
Chomsky argues that the Republican neoconservative administration of President George W. Bush, elected to the presidency in 2001, differed from earlier administrations in one key respect: it was open about adhering to the Imperial Grand Strategy, outright declaring that it would be willing to use force to ensure U.S. global hegemony despite international condemnation. Chomsky sees this as being in contrast to previous administrations, who had never explicitly informed the public that they adhered to such a doctrine. Instead, earlier administrations had discussed their intentions within elite circles which were known only to specialists or readers of dissident literature. Thus, where once only the socio-economic elite and their left-wing critics knew of the Imperial Grand Strategy, now the entire American populace are potentially aware of it. He considers this a "significant difference."

In Chomsky's view, the invasion of Iraq by a U.S. and U.K. coalition must be seen in the wider context of the U.S. government's Imperial Grand Strategy. He claims that the Iraq invasion fits the three criteria that he has highlighted for being classified as a U.S. target for preventative war. Considering the country "virtually defenseless" against the superior might of the western armed forces, he also notes that securing control of the country would be an important move for the U.S. socio-economic elite, gaining unlimited access to the country's lucrative oil resources and asserting their own military might to intimidate other nations into compliance. He also argued that government and media propaganda also set out to forge an erroneous link between Iraq President Saddam Hussein and Al-Qaeda, playing on the American people's horror of the 9/11 attacks. Furthermore, he stated that they also wrongly claimed that the Iraqi government was developing weapons of mass destruction to be used against the U.S. or its allies. Chomsky remarks that the 2003 invasion of Iraq is particularly significant because it signals the "new norm" in international relations, and that in future the U.S. might be willing to wage a preventative war against "Iran, Syria, the Andean region, and a number of others."

== Reviews ==
=== Academic reviews ===
In Hegemony or Survival, Chomsky returns to themes that have motivated most of his political writing, including the blindness of western states to their own moral failures and inconsistencies and the ruthless insistence of successive US administrations that the world will do their bidding.

— Michael T. Boyle, 2005.

Writing in the International Affairs journal, Michael T. Boyle of the Australian National University reviewed Hegemony or Survival alongside Immanuel Wallerstein's The Decline of American Power: The U.S. in a Chaotic World (2003), considering both to be "well-considered if imperfect arguments" that the Bush administration's foreign policy was in keeping with a long history of U.S. interference in global affairs. Praising its "prescient" appearance and its analysis of the historical evidence, Boyle did present some criticism of the book. In stressing the Bush administration's continuity with earlier presidencies, Boyle argued that Chomsky had neglected to highlight the differences between the Bush administration and its predecessors, in particular its willingness to break relationships with long-standing allies. Furthermore, Boyle opined that Chomsky had failed to offer a "compelling explanation" for why the U.S. government was willing to declare war on Iraq in 2003, a conflict that was far costlier and riskier than the 1980s military adventures in Nicaragua and Grenada.

Journalism lecturer David Blackall of the University of Wollongong reviewed Chomsky's book for the Asia Pacific Media Educator. He noted that it would polarize readers between those whose anti-imperialist beliefs would be reinforced and those who would denounce Chomsky's ideas as conspiracy theories. He thought the book was important in reminding readers that the War on Terror was keeping the US public in fear and was ensuring an ongoing international market for weaponry. However, he thought that there were "recurring attribution problems" in Chomsky's text, for instance by referring to the international press as if it were a homogeneous entity with a single point of view. Ultimately, he thought that the book had something to teach educators of journalism: that "[w]hen there is a desire of the power elite to move on an issue, and the population is generally opposed, then the issue is removed from the political arena and from the news media priorities – distraction being a primary method."

Eliza Mathews of the University of Queensland published a review of the book in the Journal of Australian Studies. She considered it similar to other books criticizing Bush's administration, such as those of Michael Moore, John Dean, and Bob Woodward, but thought it novel in acknowledging prior policy. She thought some of his research to be "inadequate" in supporting his arguments, relying too heavily on newspaper reports and not verifying secondary sources. In other instances, she thought it unsatisfactory that Chomsky used his own work as a reference. She thought that despite being aimed at a wide audience, the text was not "light reading", and expressed dislike at Chomsky's "sarcastic tone".

=== Press reviews ===
Chomsky is wrong to think that individuals within the American government are not thinking seriously about the costs of alliances with repressive regimes; he is also wrong to suggest that it would be easy to get the balance right between liberty and security, or democracy and equality – or to figure out what the hell to do about Pakistan. But he is right to demand that officials in Washington devote themselves more zealously to strengthening international institutions, curbing arms flows and advancing human rights.

— Samantha Power, 2004.

Views in the U.S. press were mixed. In a review for The New York Times, former U.S. ambassador to the United Nations, Harvard scholar, and Pulitzer Prize winner Samantha Power described the book as a "raging and often meandering assault" on U.S. foreign policy. Believing that Chomsky divides the world into two camps, the oppressor and the oppressed, she asserts that in Hegemony or Survival he portrays the U.S. as "the prime oppressor, [who] can do no right", meanwhile overlooking the crimes of the oppressed. Arguing that he completely ignores the concept that the U.S. might undertake any foreign interventions with good intentions, she asserts that his book is not easy to read, and that his "glib and caustic tone" are distracting. Furthermore, she highlights problems with his use of end notes, particularly when some of these notes simply reference his earlier publications. Although disagreeing with his arguments, she believed that reading his book was "sobering and instructive", having value in illustrating how many non-Americans viewed the U.S. and highlighting many of the "structural defects" in U.S. foreign policy. Furthermore, recognizing that Chomsky's "critiques have come to influence and reflect mainstream opinion elsewhere in the world," she concedes that Chomksy's analysis has a coherence that, for many, resolves much of the post-9/11 confusion and disillusionment stemming from the Bush administration's standard response to the question, "Why do they hate us?".

And it is essential to demand, as Chomsky does, that a country with the might of the United States stop being so selective in applying its principles. We will not allow our sovereignty to be infringed by international treaty commitments in the areas of human rights or even arms control, but we demand that others should. We rebuff the complaints of foreigners about the 650 people who remain holed up in Guantánamo kennels, denied access to lawyers and family members, with not even their names released. Yet we expect others to take heed of our protests about due process. We have official enemies -- those whose police abuses, arms shipments and electoral thefts we eagerly expose (Zimbabwe, Burma, North Korea, Iran). But the sins of our allies in the war on terror (Saudi Arabia, Turkey, Israel, Pakistan, Russia, Uzbekistan) are met with intentional ignorance.

— Samantha Power, 2004.

Carol Armbrust discussed Chomsky's book critically in The Antioch Review, claiming that his writing style was "a monumental turnoff" and that only those who already agreed with Chomsky's political views would read the book. Claiming that his opinions constituted "conspiracy theories", she compared his arguments to adding "two and two" together and getting "minus six". Conversely, Publishers Weekly considered it "highly readable" and thought it both "cogent and provocative", representing a significant addition to the debate on U.S. foreign policy.

Views in the British press were largely negative. Writing in The Observer, journalist Nick Cohen wrote disparagingly of Hegemony or Survival, describing Chomsky as a "master of looking-glass politics", exemplifying a trend in the western Left for being more interested in anti-Americanism than in opposing the "fascist" regime of Saddam Hussein. Focusing his critique primarily on Chomsky and his readership than the book itself, he refers to its "convoluted prose", and remarks that its argument is "dense and filled with non sequiturs". In a shorter review published in The Observer, Oliver Robinson described the work as an "unequivocally incensed, if meandering" study of U.S. foreign policy.

What sets Chomsky's work apart from so many others who write social and political theory today is that he is equally critical of the Democratic party as he is of the Republican party. Chomsky's theory portrays America's foreign policy as being consistent across partisan lines. Democrats and Republicans for that matter appear more as two wings of a capitalist, imperialist party than the two vastly different political ideologies that are presented in the popular media.

— Kate Mann.

Piyush Mathur reviewed the work for Asia Times Online, a joint Thai-Hong Kongese publication. Praising the book, Mathur argued that by being a U.S. citizen who was willing to criticise his own government, Chomsky was showing "a way beyond parochialism" that avoided nationalistic or ethnocentric intentions. Highlighting Chomsky's "wry humor and sarcasm", he notes that the author "successfully shows that the American emperor, while preaching modesty to the rest, himself struts about rather ostentatiously." Mathur also turned his attention to the most prominent press reviews of the book that appeared in the U.S. and U.K., those of Power and Cohen. He argues that the former's review was "hardly charitable", and that she had narrowly framed Hegemony or Survival as a critique purely of the Bush administration, something Mathur stated it clearly was not. Turning to Cohen's "venomous" review, he highlights that it actually dealt very little with Chomsky's book, instead offering a diatribe against the Left, one which consisted of a "thoroughly convoluted vagueness". Ultimately, Mathur notes that the "strangely defensive and rather parochial posture" adopted by Power and Cohen was "entirely in line" with the reception that Chomsky had received from the Anglo-American world.

=== Hugo Chávez's endorsement ===
In September 2006, Venezuelan President Hugo Chávez held up a Spanish-language copy of Hegemony or Survival during his speech at the United Nations. Chávez praised the work as an "excellent book to help us understand what has been happening in the world throughout the 20th century". He urged everyone present to read it, including those in the U.S., remarking that "I think that the first people who should read this book are our brothers and sisters in the United States, because their threat is right in their own house." A vocal anti-imperialist and prominent critic of U.S. foreign policy, particularly in his native Latin America, Chávez went on to describe U.S. President Bush as the "devil" in his speech.

In the U.S., demand for the book dramatically increased. Within a week, sales had risen tenfold; it reached number 1 on amazon.com's best-seller list, and number 6 in the best-seller lists of the bookstore chains Borders and Barnes & Noble. A prominent critic of Chomsky's political views, Alan Dershowitz of Harvard Law School, told The New York Times that he believed most of those buying Hegemony or Survival would not read it, remarking that "I don't know anybody who's ever read a Chomsky book". Furthermore, he related that the MIT professor "does not write page turners, he writes page stoppers. There are a lot of bent pages in Noam Chomsky's books, and they are usually at about Page 16."

In response to Chávez's endorsement, Chomsky told The New York Times that he would be "happy to meet" the Venezuelan President, asserting that he was "quite interested" in what his administration had achieved and thought many of Chávez's views to be "quite constructive". This meeting came about in August 2009, when Chomsky visited the Latin American country. In a press conference to commence the meeting, Chávez made reference to the intellectual's work, remarking "Hegemony or survival; we opt for survival", before comparing Chomsky's thesis with the concept of "Socialism or Barbarism" advocated by German Marxist Rosa Luxemburg in the early 20th century. Speaking through an interpreter, Chomsky replied that "I write about peace and criticize the barriers to peace; that's easy. What's harder is to create a better world ... and what's so exciting about at last visiting Venezuela is that I can see how a better world is being created." He went on to Venezolana de Televisión, where he commented on the U.S. government's role in orchestrating the 2009 Honduran coup d'état to overthrow leftist President Manuel Zelaya. He also expressed cautious support for the leftist reforms being implemented by Chávez's administration, remarking his opinion that their moves "toward the creation of another socio-economic model could have a global impact if these projects are successfully carried out".

In summer 2011, Chomsky expressed criticism of Chávez's government over the controversial imprisonment of judge María Lourdes Afiuni, who had been detained since December 2009. He asserted that he was "convinced that she must be set free, not only due to her physical and psychological health conditions, but in conformance with the human dignity the Bolivarian revolution presents as a goal." In December 2011, Chomsky reiterated this position, sending a letter to Chávez asking him to include the judge in his "Christmas-time pardons". Afiuni was released on June 14, 2013.

== See also ==
- Cultural hegemony
- Full-spectrum dominance
- Hegemony
- Pax Americana

== Notes ==
=== Bibliography ===
- Armbrust, Carol (2005). "Review of Hegemony or Survival". The Antioch Review. 63 (3): 594–595. doi:10.2307/4614867. JSTOR 4614867.
- Barsky, Robert F. (2007). The Chomsky Effect: A Radical Works Beyond the Ivory Tower. Cambridge: MIT Press. ISBN 978-0-262-02624-6. Archived from the original on May 14, 2008.
- Blackall, David (December 1, 2003). "Book Review: Hegemony or Survival". Asia Pacific Media Educator.
- "Books". chomsky.info.
- Boyle, Michael T. (2005). "Review: Hegemony or survival: America's quest for global dominance". International Affairs. 81 (1): 260–261. JSTOR 3569230.
- Carroll, Rory (September 25, 2006). "Chávez boosts Chomsky sales". The Guardian. London.
- Carroll, Rory (July 3, 2011). "Noam Chomsky criticises old friend Hugo Chávez for 'assault' on democracy". The Guardian. London.
- "Chavez boosts Chomsky book sales". London: BBC News. September 25, 2006.
- "Chomsky is Citation Champ". MIT News Office. April 15, 1992.
- Chomsky, Noam (2003). Hegemony or Survival. Metropolitan Books. ISBN 978-0-8050-7400-0.
- Chomsky, Noam (November 26, 2003). "Books: 'Hegemony or Survival'". The Washington Post.
- Cohen, Nick (December 14, 2003). "By the left ... about turn". The Observer. London.
- Dellinger, Matt (March 24, 2003). "Sounds and Sites: Noam Chomsky". The New Yorker.
- "HEGEMONY OR SURVIVAL: America's Quest for Global Dominance". Review. Publishers Weekly. October 13, 2003.
- Hogan, Ron (December 8, 2003). "Taking Back the Word: PW Talks with Steve Fraser and Tom Engelhardt". Publishers Weekly.
- Hughes, Samuel (July–August 2001). "Speech!". The Pennsylvania Gazette. Archived from the original on September 29, 2007 – via chomsky.info.
- Mann, Kate (n.d.). "Hegemony or Survival". About.com. Archived from the original on December 6, 2003.
- Mathur, Piyash (July 10, 2004). "A case against self-annihilation". Asia Times Online. Hong Kong. Archived from the original on July 11, 2004.
- Matthews, Eliza (2004). "Review of Hegemony or Survival". Journal of Australian Studies. 28 (83): 146–147. doi:10.1080/14443050409387982. S2CID 216136757.
- Phillips, Tom; Lopez, Virginia (December 21, 2011). "Noam Chomsky pleads with Hugo Chávez to free judge in open letter". The Guardian. London.
- Power, Samantha (January 4, 2004). "The Everything Explainer". The New York Times.
- Rich, Motoko (September 23, 2006). "Chomsky book a best-seller after Chavez speech". The New York Times.
- Robinson, Oliver (May 23, 2004). "Why do they hate us?". The Observer. London.
- Robinson, Paul (February 25, 1979). "The Chomsky Problem". The New York Times.
- Romero, Simon (July 2, 2011). "Noted Leftist Urges Chávez to Release Ailing Judge". The New York Times.
- Suggett, James (August 28, 2009). "Noam Chomsky in Venezuela: 'A better world is being created'". Rabble.ca. Canada.
