= Elliott Sober =

American philosopher

- Born: June 6, 1948 (age 78); Baltimore, Maryland, U.S.
- Education: Harvard University
- Scientific career
- Fields: Philosophy of science
- Doctoral advisor: Hilary Putnam

President of the DLMPST/IUHPST
- In office 2012–2015
- Preceded by: Wilfrid Hodges
- Succeeded by: Menachem Magidor

Elliott R. Sober (born 6 June 1948) is an American philosopher. He is noted for his work in philosophy of biology and general philosophy of science. Sober is Hans Reichenbach Professor and William F. Vilas Research Professor Emeritus in the Department of Philosophy at the University of Wisconsin–Madison.

== Education and career ==
Sober earned his Ph.D. in philosophy from Harvard University under the supervision of Hilary Putnam, after doing graduate work at Cambridge University under the supervision of Mary Hesse. His work has also been strongly influenced by the biologist Richard Lewontin, and he has collaborated with David Sloan Wilson, Steven Orzack and Mike Steel, also biologists.

Sober joined the Wisconsin faculty in 1974, and retired in 2023. He was also a tenured professor of philosophy at Stanford University in 2003-04, before returning to Wisconsin. He will be a visiting professor at Stanford for 2023-2026.

Sober has served as the president of both the Central Division of the American Philosophical Association and the Philosophy of Science Association. He was president of the International Union of History and Philosophy of Science (Division of Logic, Methodology, and Philosophy of Science) from 2012 until 2015. He taught for one year at Stanford University and has been a regular visiting professor at the London School of Economics.

Since 2013, Sober has been listed on the Advisory Council of the National Center for Science Education.

== Philosophical work ==
One of Sober's main fields of research has been the subject of simplicity or parsimony in connection with theory evaluation in science. Sober also has been interested in altruism, both as the concept is used in evolutionary biology and also as it is used in connection with human psychology. His book with David Sloan Wilson, Unto Others: the Evolution and Psychology of Unselfish Behavior (1998), addresses both topics.

Sober has been a prominent critic of intelligent design. He also has written about evidence and probability, scientific realism and instrumentalism, laws of nature, the mind-body problem and naturalism.

=== Philosophy of biology ===
Sober's The Nature of Selection: Evolutionary Theory in Philosophical Focus (1984) has been instrumental in establishing the philosophy of biology as a prominent research area in philosophy. According to the Stanford Encyclopedia of Philosophy, "The Nature of Selection...marks the point at which most philosophers became aware of the philosophy of biology." In his review of the book, biologist Ernst Mayr wrote "Sober has ... given us what is perhaps the most careful and penetrating analysis of the concept of natural selection as it affects the process of evolution".

Sober has worked on clarifying and defending the idea of group selection; see, for example, his book with David Sloan Wilson, Unto Others – the Evolution and Psychology of Unselfish Behavior (1998). Sober also has worked with the biologist Mike Steel, exploring conceptual questions about the idea of common ancestry. And Sober has worked with the biologist Steven Orzack, clarifying and critiquing Richard Levins's 1966 paper "The Strategy of Model Building in Population Biology;" they also have worked together on the concept of adaptationism, and have devised a methodology for testing the hypothesis that two species exhibit a trait because they have a common ancestor, and not because natural selection caused each to evolve the trait.

=== Parsimony ===
Sober's first publication on parsimony was his 1975 book, Simplicity. In it, he argued that the simplicity of a hypothesis should be understood in terms of a concept of question-relative informativeness. Sober abandoned this theory in the 1980s when he started to think about the concept of cladistic parsimony used in evolutionary biology. This led him to think of parsimony in terms of the concept of likelihood, an idea he developed in his 1988 book Reconstructing the Past: Parsimony, Evolution, and Inference. In the 1990s he started to think about the role of parsimony in model selection theory—for example, in the Akaike Information Criterion. He published a series of articles in this area with Malcolm Forster, the first of which was their 1994 paper "How to Tell When Simpler, More Unified, or Less Ad Hoc Theories Will Provide More Accurate Predictions." In 2002 he published a new article "Instrumentalism, Parsimony, and the Akaike Framework," explaining how Akaike’s criterion and framework and the ideas behind them connect to the epistemology of instrumentalism. His most recent publication on parsimony, his 2015 book Ockham's Razors: A User's Manual, describes both the likelihood framework and the model selection frameworks as two viable "parsimony paradigms."

== Books ==
- Simplicity, Oxford University Press, 1975.
- (edited) Conceptual Issues in Evolutionary Biology: An Anthology, Bradford/MIT Press, 1984; 2nd edition 1993.
- The Nature of Selection: Evolutionary Theory in Philosophical Focus, Bradford/MIT Press, 1984; 2nd edition, University of Chicago Press, 1993.
- Reconstructing the Past: Parsimony, Evolution, and Inference, Bradford/MIT Press, 1988; Japanese edition, Souju Publishers, Tokyo, 1996.
- Core Questions in Philosophy – A Text with Readings, Macmillan 1990; Prentice Hall 2nd edition 1995; Pearson Publishers 3rd edition 2000; 4th edition 2005; 5th edition 2009, 6th edition 2013; Routledge 7th edition 2019.
- Philosophy of Biology, Westview Press (in UK: Oxford University Press), 1993; 2nd edition, 1999; Spanish edition, Alianza, 1996; Chinese edition, 2000; Korean edition, Chul Hak Kwa Hyun Sil Sa Publishing Co., 2004.
- (with Erik Wright and Andrew Levine) Reconstructing Marxism: Essays on Explanation and the Theory of History, Verso Press, 1992; Portuguese edition, 1993.
- From a Biological Point of View: Essays in Evolutionary Philosophy, Cambridge University Press, 1994.
- (with David Sloan Wilson) Unto Others: The Evolution and Psychology of Unselfish Behavior, Harvard University Press, 1998; Spanish edition, Siglo Veintiouno de España Editores, 2000.
- (edited with Steven Orzack) Adaptationism and Optimality, Cambridge University Press, 2001.
- Evidence and Evolution, Cambridge University Press, 2008.
- Did Darwin Write the Origin Backwards, Prometheus Books, 2011.
- Ockham’s Razors – A User’s Manual, Cambridge University Press, 2015.
- The Design Argument, Cambridge University Press, 2018.
- The Philosophy of Evolutionary Theory, Cambridge University Press, 2024

== Selected articles and book chapters ==
- Orzack, Steven Hecht; Sober, Elliott (1993). "A Critical Assessment of Levins's The Strategy of Model Building in Population Biology (1966)". The Quarterly Review of Biology. 68 (4). University of Chicago Press: 533–546. doi:10.1086/418301. ISSN 0033-5770. S2CID 83524824.
- Orzack, Steven Hecht; Sober, Elliott (1994). "Optimality Models and the Test of Adaptationism". The American Naturalist. 143 (3). University of Chicago Press: 361–380. doi:10.1086/285608. ISSN 0003-0147. S2CID 86455809.
- Orzack, Steven Hecht; Sober, Elliott (4 June 2001). "Adaptation, Phylogenetic Inertia, and the Method of Controlled Comparisons". Adaptationism and Optimality. Cambridge University Press. pp. 45–63. doi:10.1017/cbo9780511609084.003. ISBN 978-0-521-59166-9.
- Sober, E; Steel, M (21 October 2002). "Testing the hypothesis of common ancestry". Journal of Theoretical Biology. 218 (4): 395–408. doi:10.1016/S0022-5193(02)93086-9. ISSN 0022-5193. PMID 12384044.
- Sober, Elliott; Orzack, Steven Hecht (1 September 2003). "Common Ancestry and Natural Selection". The British Journal for the Philosophy of Science. 54 (3). University of Chicago Press: 423–437. doi:10.1093/bjps/54.3.423. ISSN 0007-0882.
- Sober, Elliott; Steel, Mike (6 January 2011). "Entropy increase and information loss in Markov models of evolution". Biology & Philosophy. 26 (2). Springer Science and Business Media LLC: 223–250. doi:10.1007/s10539-010-9239-x. ISSN 0169-3867. S2CID 1717581.
- Sober, E.; Wilson, D. S. (13 January 2011). "Adaptation and Natural Selection revisited". Journal of Evolutionary Biology. 24 (2). Wiley: 462–468. doi:10.1111/j.1420-9101.2010.02162.x. ISSN 1010-061X. PMID 21226890. S2CID 9439962.
- Sober, Elliott; Steel, Mike (2014). "Time and Knowability in Evolutionary Processes". Philosophy of Science. 81 (4). University of Chicago Press: 558–579. arXiv:1301.6470. doi:10.1086/677954. ISSN 0031-8248. S2CID 15455041.
- Sober, Elliott; Steel, Mike (2015). "How probable is common ancestry according to different evolutionary processes?". Journal of Theoretical Biology. 373. Elsevier BV: 111–116. Bibcode:2015JThBi.373..111S. doi:10.1016/j.jtbi.2015.03.012. ISSN 0022-5193. PMID 25796555.
- Sober, Elliott; Steel, Mike (1 September 2017). "Similarities as Evidence for Common Ancestry: A Likelihood Epistemology". The British Journal for the Philosophy of Science. 68 (3). University of Chicago Press: 617–638. arXiv:1501.04665. doi:10.1093/bjps/axv052. ISSN 0007-0882.

Academic offices
Preceded by Wilfrid Hodges	President of the Division for Logic, Methodology and Philosophy of Science and Technology of the International Union for History and Philosophy of Science and Technology (DLMPST/IUHPST); 2012–2015	Succeeded by Menachem Magidor
