= 2006 Chávez speech at the United Nations =

Speech by Venezuelan President Hugo Chávez

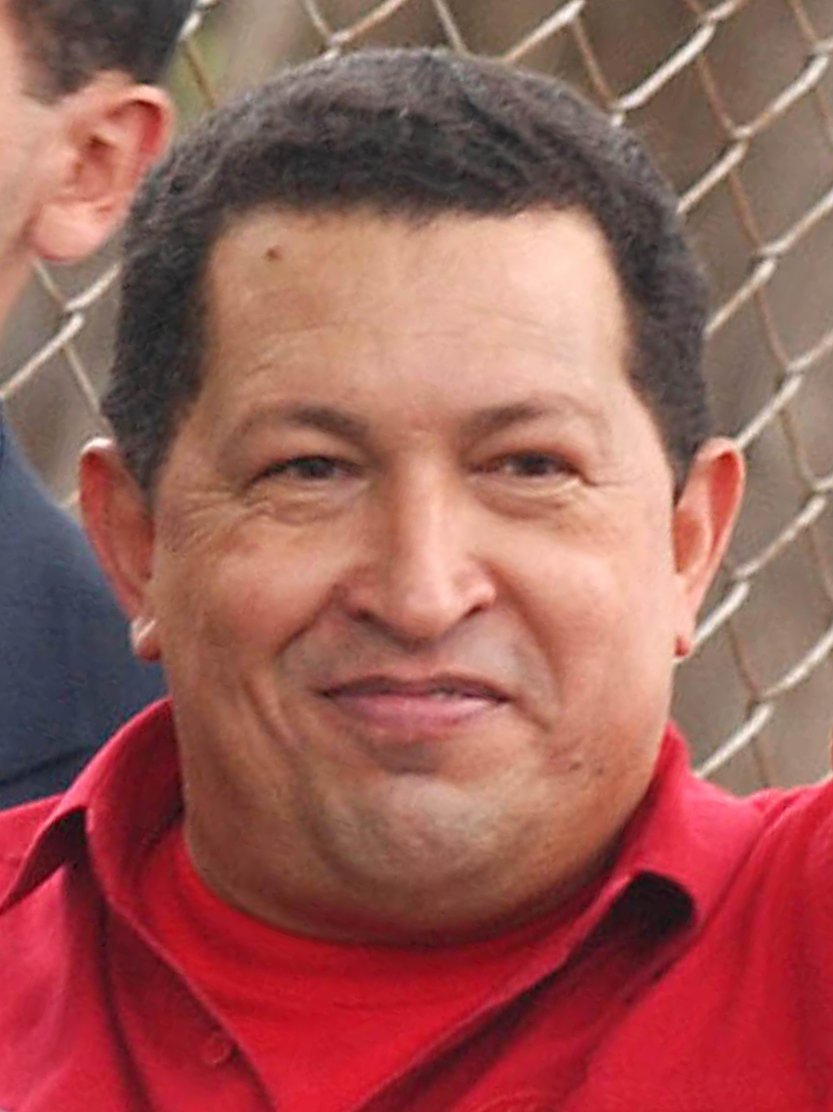
Hugo Chávez in 2006

On 20 September 2006, Venezuelan President Hugo Chávez delivered a speech to the United Nations General Assembly denouncing U.S. President George W. Bush, with particular focus on foreign policy. The speech received international praise due in part to the strong worldwide unpopularity of the policies of the George W. Bush administration. While the speech was received with sustained applause in the General Assembly, and even from some in the United States, particularly on the left wing, it was met with abrasive bipartisan criticism by many public and elected officials in the United States. Despite the criticism that this speech attracted from U.S. officials, Chavez' UN speech came at a time when then President George W. Bush's approval rating was at an all-time low among the American public, and support for the speech was higher than many experts would expect.

== Speech ==
Speaking one day after Bush addressed the same session of the General Assembly, Chávez announced, "The devil came here yesterday, and it smells of sulfur still today, this table that I am now standing in front of." At that point, Chávez made the sign of the cross, positioned his hands as if praying, and looked briefly upwards as if in invocation of God. He continued "Yesterday, ladies and gentlemen, from this rostrum, the President of the United States, the gentleman to whom I refer as the devil, came here, talking as if he owned the world." Chávez also said that President Bush "...came [to the General Assembly] to share his nostrums to try to preserve the current pattern of domination, exploitation and pillage of the peoples of the world." Chávez began his talk by recommending Noam Chomsky's Hegemony or Survival: "It's an excellent book to help us understand what has been happening in the world throughout the 20th century, and what's happening now, and the greatest threat looming over our planet." Citing Chomsky's book, Chávez explained, "...the American empire is doing all it can to consolidate its system of domination. And we cannot allow them to do that. We cannot allow world dictatorship to be consolidated."

The speech was delivered in Spanish with voice-over U.N. interpretation.

== Reactions ==
=== Reaction in Venezuela ===
A Zogby poll conducted in October 2006, a month after Chávez's speech, revealed that 36 percent of Venezuelans polled said the speech made them proud of Chávez as their president, while 23 percent said it made them ashamed. An additional 15 percent were indifferent, while 26 percent said they were either unfamiliar with the speech or unsure what to think about it.

=== Reaction of U.S. politicians ===
Many U.S. politicians, from both houses of Congress, released a flurry of press releases in response to the statements Chávez made during his speech.

- Nancy Pelosi (D-California), the incoming Speaker of the House of Representatives (and an ardent critic of President Bush), called Chávez an "everyday thug" as opposed to the "modern day Simón Bolívar" that he "fancies himself to be". She also asserted that "Hugo Chávez abused the privilege that he had, speaking at the United Nations" and "he demeaned himself and he demeaned Venezuela."
- Representative Charles Rangel (D-New York) also said in a press release that "George Bush is the President of the United States and represents the entire country. Any demeaning public attack against him is viewed by Republicans and Democrats, and all Americans, as an attack on all of us".
- Senator Tom Harkin (D-Iowa) called Chávez's comments "incendiary." He went on to say "Let me put it this way, I can understand the frustration, ah, and the anger of certain people around the world because of George Bush's policies." Harkin continued on with what has been uniform and frequent criticism of the President Bush's foreign policy. "We tend to forget that a few days after 9/11 thousands, thousands of Iranians marched in a candlelight procession in Tehran in support of the United States. Every Muslim country was basically on our side. Just think, in five years, President Bush has squandered all that."
- Former President Bill Clinton (D-Arkansas) called the "personal demonization" a "mistake" that only hurt Chávez and his country.

Responding to American political criticisms in the 10 October 2006 issue of Time magazine, Chávez said that he was not attacking Bush, but counterattacking. Chávez said that Bush had said much worse things about him, and that "Bush has been attacking the world, and not just with words--with bombs". He argued that he was reacting to what he perceived to be the "threat of a U.S. empire that uses the U.N. to justify its aggression against half the world" and that he wanted to "wake up U.S. and global public opinion".

=== Reactions in Ecuador ===
Rafael Correa — then a candidate for Ecuadorian President, and subsequently elected in November 2006 — said that calling George Bush the devil was an "insult to the devil because although he's malicious, [at least] he's intelligent." Correa, outspoken critic of U.S. foreign policy, has described George W. Bush as a "tremendously dimwitted president who has greatly damaged his country and the world".
