= Asia Pacific Media Educator =

- Discipline: Media studies
- Language: English
- Edited by: Sundeep R. Muppidi

Publication details
- History: June 2012
- Publisher: SAGE Publications
- Frequency: Biannually

Standard abbreviations
- ISO 4: Asia Pac. Media Educ.

Indexing
- ISSN: 1326-365X (print); 2321-5410 (web)

Links
- Journal homepage; Online access; Online archive

The Asia Pacific Media Educator is a biannual peer-reviewed academic journal published by SAGE Publications in collaboration with the School of the Arts, English and Media of the Faculty of Law, Humanities and the Arts at the University of Wollongong (Australia).

== Abstracting and indexing ==
The journal is abstracted and indexed in Emerging Sources Citation Index and Scopus.
