= Thomas Ferguson (academic) =

American political scientist and author

- Born: 1949 (age 76–77)
- Education: Princeton University (PhD)
- Known for: Investment theory of party competition
- Scientific career
- Fields: Political science
- Workplaces: University of Massachusetts Boston, MIT, University of Texas, Austin

Thomas Ferguson (born 1949) is an American political scientist and author who writes on politics and economics, often within a historical perspective. He is best known for his Investment Theory of Party Competition, described in detail in his 1995 book Golden Rule: The Investment Theory of Party Competition and the Logic of Money-driven Political Systems.

== Biography ==
Ferguson obtained his Ph.D. from Princeton University before teaching at the Massachusetts Institute of Technology and the University of Texas, Austin. He later moved to the University of Massachusetts Boston where he is now Emeritus Professor of Political Science. Ferguson is a member of the advisory board for the Institute for New Economic Thinking where he is Director of Research, and was also a senior fellow at the Roosevelt Institute.

Alongside his academic work Ferguson has also contributed widely to popular media. He has been a contributing editor at The Nation and a contributing writer to The Huffington Post. He is also a contributing editor at AlterNet.

== Investment theory of party competition ==
Ferguson is best known for his investment theory of party competition, which was detailed most extensively in his 1995 book Golden Rule: The Investment Theory of Party Competition and the Logic of Money-Driven Political Systems. The theory states that political systems featuring party competition are best understood as competitions for investment from wealthy segments of society. This is because political campaigns are expensive, and so political parties whose policies are most attractive to wealthy 'investors' will tend to be more successful as they are better able to attract the finances required to win election campaigns.

The theory contrasts with the median voter theorem, which states that the outcome of elections will be the preferences of the median voter as political parties converge on the 'center ground' as they compete for votes.

In 2009, the documentary Golden Rule: The Investment Theory of Politics about the theory was released, it featured speakers including Thomas Ferguson, Noam Chomsky and Michael Albert.

== MIT controversy ==
According to Noam Chomsky, Ferguson was warned while at MIT that his research might get him denied tenure in the political science department. In Chomsky's account, Ferguson was told "If you ever want to get tenure in this department, keep away from anything after the New Deal; you can write all of your radical stuff up to the New Deal, but if you try and do it for the post-New Deal period, you're never going to get tenure in this department." Although not explicitly mentioned, the research was ostensibly the investment theory of party competition.

== Selected works ==
Ferguson has written numerous scholarly articles, magazine pieces, and a number of books.

=== Books ===
- Ferguson, Thomas; Rogers, Joel, eds. (1984). The Political Economy: Readings in the Politics and Economics of American Public Policy (3rd print ed.). New York: M.E. Sharpe, Inc. ISBN 0873322762.
- Ferguson, Thomas; Rogers, Joel (1988). Right turn: The Decline of the Democrats and the Future of American Politics (3. print. ed.). New York: Hill and Wang. ISBN 0809001705.
- Ferguson, Thomas (1995). Golden Rule: The Investment Theory of Party Competition and the Logic of Money-driven Political Systems. Chicago: University of Chicago Press. ISBN 0226243176.

=== Scholarly ===
- Ferguson, Thomas (1973). "The Political Economy of Knowledge and the Changing Politics of the Philosophy of Science". Telos. 15 (Spring).
- Ferguson, Thomas (1983). "Party Realignment and American Industrial Structure: The Investment Theory of Political Parties in Historical Perspective". Research in Political Economy. 6.
- Ferguson, Thomas (1984). "From Normalcy to New Deal: Industrial structure, Party Competition, and American Public Policy in the Great Depression" (PDF). International Organization. 38 (1): 41–94. doi:10.1017/s0020818300004276. S2CID 154932073. Archived from the original (PDF) on 2016-03-04.
- Epstein, Gerald; Ferguson, Thomas (1984). "Monetary Policy, Loan Liquidation, and Industrial Conflict: The Federal Reserve and the Open Market Operations of 1932". The Journal of Economic History. 44 (4): 957-983.
- Ferguson, Thomas (1986). "Elites and Elections, or: What Have They Done to You Lately? Toward an Investment Theory of Political Parties and Critical Realignment". In Ginsberg, Benjamin; Stone, Alan (eds.). Do Elections Matter?. M.E. Sharpe. ISBN 978-1-56324-446-9.
- Ferguson, Thomas (1989). "By Invitation Only: Party Competition and Industrial Structure in the 1988 Election". Socialist Review. 19: 73–103.
- Ferguson, Thomas (1991). "Industrial Structure and Party Competition in the New Deal". Sociological Perspectives. 34 (4): 493–526. doi:10.2307/1389404. JSTOR 1389404. S2CID 147028378.
- Ferguson, Thomas (1992). "Money and Politics". In Hodgson, Godfrey (ed.). The United States (Handbooks to the Modern World). Facts on File. ISBN 978-0816016211.
- Ferguson, Thomas; Galbraith, James K. (2001). "The American Wage Structure, 1920-1947". In Galbraith, James K.; Berner, Maureen (eds.). Inequality and Industrial Change: A Global View. Cambridge University Press. pp. 33–78. ISBN 9780521662741.
- Ferguson, Thomas (2001). "Blowing Smoke: Impeachment, the Clinton Presidency, and the Political Economy". In Crotty, William J. (ed.). The State of Democracy in America. Georgetown University Press. pp. 195–254. ISBN 9780878408610.
- Ferguson, Thomas (2005), "Holy Owned Subsidiary: Globalization, Religion and Politics in the 2004 Election", in Crotty, William J. (ed.), A Defining Election: The Presidential Race of 2004, Routledge, ISBN 1317478185. Longer version available here.
- Ferguson, Thomas; Voth, Hans-Joachim (2008). "Betting on Hitler: The Value of Political Connections in Nazi Germany". Quarterly Journal of Economics. 123 (1): 101–137. doi:10.1162/qjec.2008.123.1.101. hdl:10230/6068. S2CID 10732055.
- Ferguson, Thomas; Johnson, Robert (2009). "Too Big to Bail: The 'Paulson Put,' Presidential Politics, and the Global Financial Meltdown, Part I: From Shadow Banking System to Shadow Bailout". International Journal of Political Economy. 38 (1): 3–34. doi:10.2753/ijp0891-1916380101. S2CID 155020004.
- Ferguson, Thomas; Johnson, Robert (2009). "Too Big to Bail: The 'Paulson Put,' Presidential Politics, and the Global Financial Meltdown, Part II: Fatal Reversal - Single Payer and Back". International Journal of Political Economy. 38 (2): 5–45. doi:10.2753/ijp0891-1916380201. S2CID 153842087.
- Ferguson, Thomas; Johnson, Robert (2011). "A World Upside Down? Deficit Fantasies in the Great Recession". International Journal of Political Economy. 40 (1): 3-47. doi:10.2753/IJP0891-1916400101.
- Ferguson, Thomas; Jorgensen, Paul; Chen, Jie (2013). "Party Competition and Industrial Structure in the 2012 Elections: Who's Really Driving the Taxi to the Dark Side?". International Journal of Political Economy. 42 (3): 3–41. doi:10.2753/IJP0891-1916420201. S2CID 155300121.

=== Popular ===
- "Financial Regulation? Don't Get Your Hopes Up", Talking Points Memo, 2008-04-17
- "Bridge Loan to Nowhere?", The Nation, 2008-09-24
- Ferguson, Thomas; Chen, Jie; Jorgensen, Paul (July 17, 2012). "Cover Ups Are Worse Than Vanishing Data: The Facts About the FEC's Data Downloads". AlterNet.
- Ferguson, Thomas; Chen, Jie; Jorgensen, Paul (December 20, 2012). "Revealed: Why the Pundits Are Wrong About Big Money and the 2012 Elections". AlterNet.
- Ferguson, Thomas (June 28, 2016). "Defying the Investors: Thomas Ferguson on how voter alienation from corporate candidates produced this year's dizzying election results". Jacobin.
