= Hamburger University =

McDonald's training facilities in Chicago

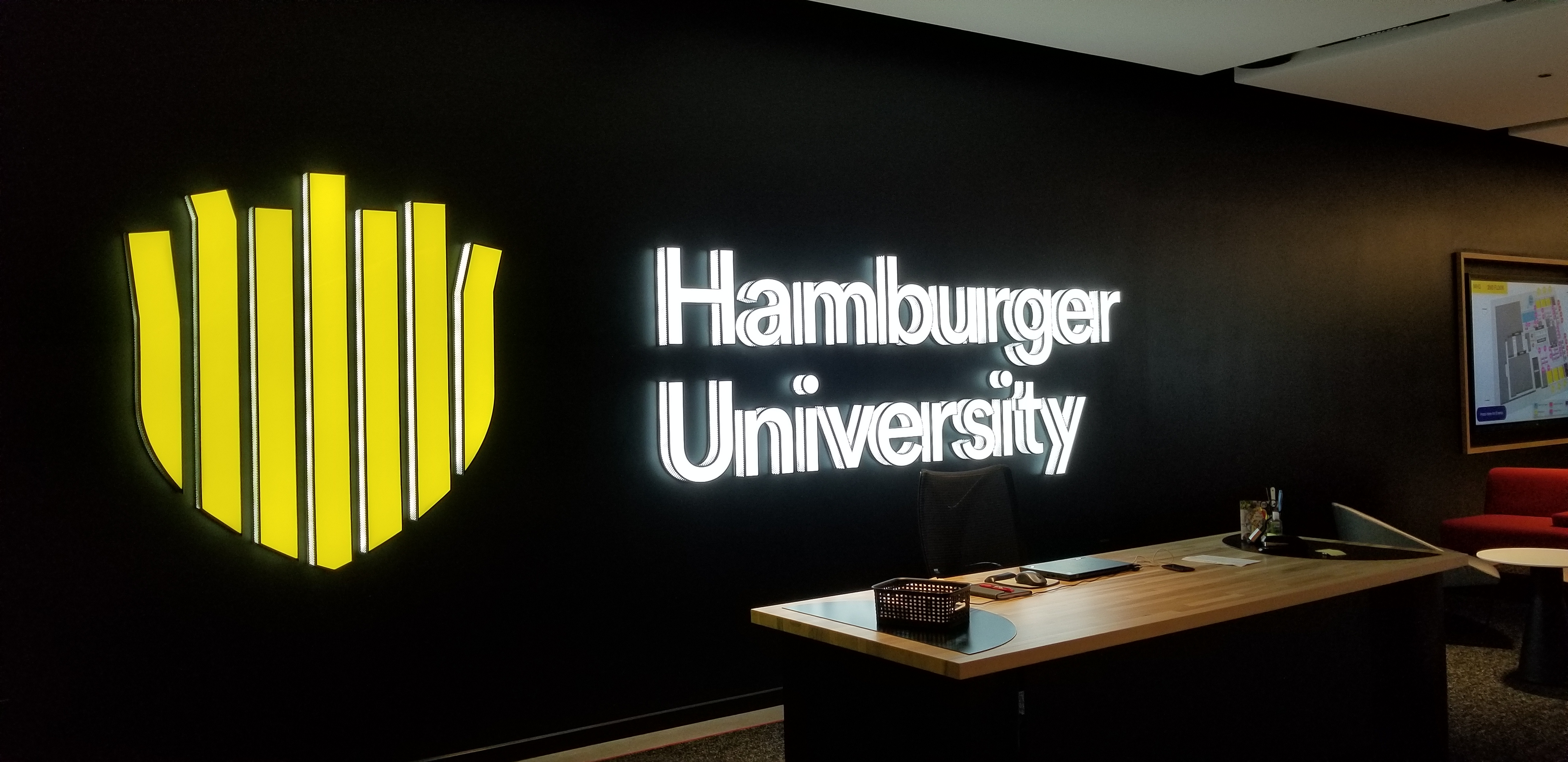
- Motto: Learning Today, Leading Tomorrow
- Type: Corporate university
- Established: 1961
- Affiliations: McDonald's
- Campus: Urban
- Colors: Red, white

Hamburger University is a training facility at the McDonald's Corporation global headquarters in Chicago, Illinois. It instructs high-potential restaurant managers, mid-managers, and owner-operators in restaurant management. Hamburger University's mission is to become an “organizational culture hub, introducing a continuous education process for the value chain and transforming knowledge into actual business results.” Hamburger University students take courses about restaurant operations, leadership skills, customer service, operations, and procedures.

More than 5,000 students attend Hamburger University each year and over 275,000 people have graduated with a degree in "Hamburgerology." 40% of McDonald's global leadership has attended Hamburger University.

== History ==
Hamburger University training started in 1961 with a class of 14 people in the basement of one of its restaurants. The educational program was operated by Fred L. Turner, a grill cook. Turner would eventually contribute significantly to the growth of McDonald's and become the CEO of McDonald's for 20 years.

Hamburger University was originally located on an 80-acre (32 ha) campus at the company's global headquarters in Oak Brook, Illinois from its founding until 2018, when both the McDonald's headquarters and Hamburger University moved to West Loop, Chicago, in a new complex built on the site of the former headquarters of Oprah Winfrey's Harpo Studios and previously Fred A. Niles Communications Center.

The previous location in Oak Brook was purchased in June 2019 by John Paul DeJoria, co-founder of John Paul Mitchell Systems.

== Locations ==
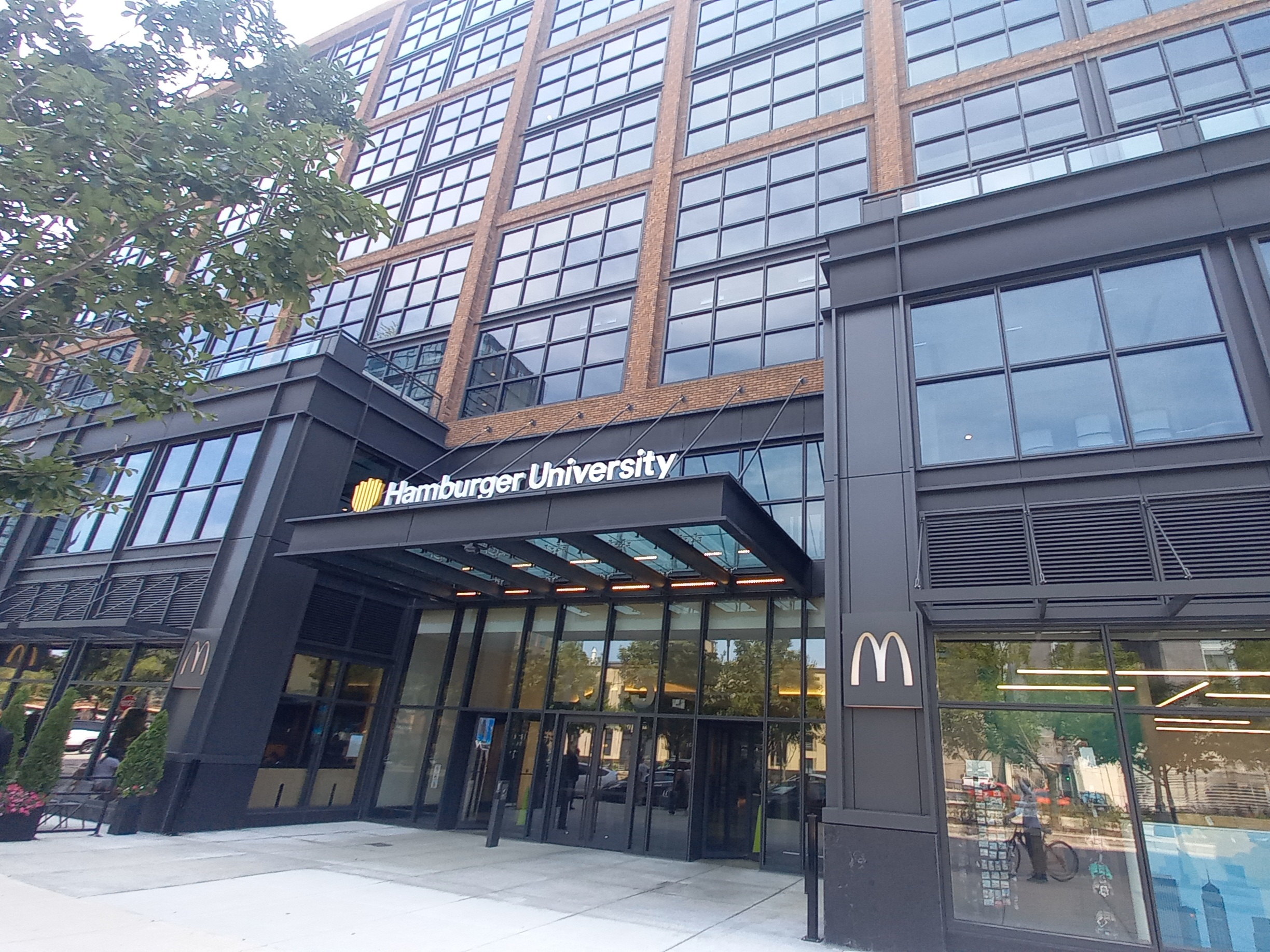
The entrance to Hamburger University in Chicago

Hamburger University currently has eight campuses worldwide in addition to the main campus in Chicago, Illinois: Tokyo, London, Sydney, Munich, São Paulo, Shanghai, and Moscow.

The Shanghai location is housed in a 28-story building that serves as McDonald's China headquarters. The school takes up 16,846 square feet (1,565.0 m^{2}) and is decorated with pictures of McDonald's products and equipment. The school accepts less than 1% of applicants.

== In popular culture ==
Hamburger University was satirized in the 1986 comedy Hamburger: The Motion Picture. It was also spoofed by McDonald's itself in a commercial with Ronald McDonald in which several animatronic hamburgers were shown graduating.
