= Andrew Szasz =

Andrew Szasz is the chair of the sociology department at the University of California at Santa Cruz.

== Selected publications ==
- Shopping Our Way to Safety: How We Changed from Protecting the Environment to Protecting Ourselves (University of Minnesota Press, 2007)
- with Walter L Goldfrank; David Goodman: Ecology and the world-system. Westport, Conn. : Praeger, 1999
- with Michael R Meuser: Santa Clara County toxics and demographics maps. Santa Cruz, CA : Sustainable Economic & Environmental Knowledge, Map Cruzin, 1996
- EcoPopulism: Toxic Waste and the Movement for Environmental Justice. Minneapolis: University of Minnesota Press 1994
- Environmental protection and the grass roots. Minneapolis : University of Minnesota Press, 1994.
- The dynamics of socil regulation : a study of the formation and evolution of the Occupational Safety and Health Administration. Dissertation University of Wisconsin-Madison, 1982
