= Investment theory of party competition =

Political theory

The investment theory of party competition is a political theory developed by Thomas Ferguson, Emeritus Professor of Political Science at the University of Massachusetts Boston. The theory focuses on how business elites, not voters, play the leading part in political systems. The theory offers an alternative to the conventional, voter-focused, voter realignment theory and median voter theorem, which has been criticized by Ferguson and others.

== History ==
The Investment Theory of Party Competition was first outlined by Thomas Ferguson in his 1983 work Party Realignment and American Industrial Structure: The Investment Theory of Political Parties in Historical Perspective. The theory is detailed most extensively in Ferguson's 1995 book Golden Rule: The Investment Theory of Party Competition and the Logic of Money-driven Political Systems, in which his earlier work is republished as a chapter.

== Overview ==
Ferguson frames his theory as being both inspired by and an alternative to the traditional median voter theories of democracy such as that posited by Anthony Downs in his 1957 work An Economic Theory of Democracy. Quoting Downs, Ferguson accepts that 'the expense of political awareness is so great that no citizen can afford to bear it in every policy area, even if by doing so he could discover places where his intervention would reap large profits'. While Downs largely overlooked the implications of this insight, Ferguson makes it the foundation of the Investment Theory of Party Competition, recognizing that if voters cannot bear the cost of becoming informed about public affairs they have little hope of successfully supervising government.

The real market for political parties is defined by major investors, who generally have good and clear reason for investing to control the state....Blocs of major investors define the core of political parties and are responsible for most of the signals the party sends to the electorate.

— Thomas Ferguson

The central claim of the Investment Theory is that since ordinary citizens cannot afford to acquire the information required to invest in political parties, the political system will be dominated by those who can. As a result, the investment theory holds that rather than being seen as simple vote maximizers, political parties are best analyzed as blocs of investors who coalesce to advance candidates representing their interests.

=== The role of political parties ===
Contrary to the median voter theorem where political parties have traditionally been seen as vote maximizers who will seek out the position of the 'median voter' on any particular issue, the Investment Theory holds the real area of competition for political parties is major investors who have an interest in investing to control the state.

This is because, in situations where money is important, political parties must take positions that enable them to attract the investment required to run successful campaigns. This is the case even if those positions are not supported by the majority of the population, since it is futile for a party to adopt even a popular position if it cannot afford the expense of communicating that position to the electorate in an election campaign. In fact the Investment theory predicts that in many cases political parties are more likely to try and change the position of the public to match those of its investors than vice versa.

Instead political parties will try to assemble the votes they need through appeals to the electorate on issues that do not conflict with the interests of their investors. Vigorous debate may take place on issues where an opposing bloc of investors is able to mobilize and advertise their position. A further consequence of this theory is that in policy areas where large investors agree on policy, no party competition will take place. This is the case regardless of the views of the general population, unless ordinary citizens are able to become major investors in their own right through expenditure of time and income.

=== The role of ordinary voters ===
The Investment Theory of Party Competition does not deny the possibility that masses of voters can become major investors in an electoral system, and accepts that in cases where this does happen the effect may resemble classical voter competition models. For this to happen, however, generally requires channels that facilitate mass deliberation and expression, typically 'secondary' organizations capable of spreading the cost of acquiring information and concentrating contributions from many individuals to act politically. Such conditions may enable high information flows to the general population and make political debate and action a part of everyday life. Where these conditions do not exist, however, it is unlikely that ordinary citizens will be able to afford the costs required to control policy.

The electorate is not too stupid or too tired to control the political system. It is merely too poor.

— Thomas Ferguson

A consequence of the Investment Theory is that it is not necessary to assume that the voting population is stupid or malevolent to explain why it will often vote for parties whose policies are opposed to their own interests. In fact, Ferguson suggests, the general population is far from ignorant or uninterested in the outcome of elections, and will often make considerable effort to understand the issues under discussion. Voting decisions ultimately, however, must be made on the basis of the information that is available, and if acquiring information is expensive in terms of time or money then most likely those decisions will be made on the basis of information subsidized by wealthy investors.

=== The role of wealthy investors ===
According to Ferguson, who credits the insight to Downs, one of the reasons that wealthy investors are able to influence politics to their advantage is that much of the politically relevant information that is so expensive for ordinary citizens to acquire comes quite naturally to businesses in the course of their daily operations. An example might include international banks whose business contacts constitute 'a first-rate foreign policy network'.

Similarly, economies of scale give businesses an advantage over ordinary voters. For example, large investors will routinely consult with lawyers, public relations advisors, lobbyists, and political consultants before acting. The cost of this advice is prohibitively expensive for most citizens.

Since investors cannot guarantee the outcome of an election or know exactly what policies a candidate will implement once in power, they must estimate the chances their investment will be successful. In some cases, this may lead to investors supporting more than one candidate, perhaps in more than one party. In other cases, it is expected that an investor will judge that one party will never accept its desired policies and so will become the 'core' of one party. Ferguson cites the support of labor-intensive industries such as textiles and steel supporting the Republican party after the New Deal as an example, owing to their labor policy.

Although the Investment Theory recognizes the importance of financial contributions to political parties, Ferguson notes that direct cash contributions 'are probably not the most important way in which truly top business figures ("major investors") act politically'. Investors are also likely to act as sources of contacts, fundraisers, and as sources of legitimation for candidates, particularly through endorsements in the media. Similarly, the theory does not predict that elections will be won by the party that is able to spend the most money. Instead, it suggests that while parties will likely need to attract significant resources in order to be able to mount a successful campaign, they do not necessarily need to attract the most money.

=== Comparison to other election theories ===
The Investment Theory makes a number of novel predictions compared to other theories of party systems.

Comparison between the Investment Theory and Realignment theory
	Realignment theory	Investment Theory
Party competition on key issues	Parties will compete vigorously, even leap-frog each other, to adopt the position of the median voter.	Vigorous debate may take place where major blocs of investors take opposing positions. On issues where major investors agree little or no competition between parties will take place, with parties more likely to try and change the position of the public to match their own than vice versa.
Changes in political power (or realignment)	Voters change their political views based on the performance of the party and vote differently.	Economic changes cause shifts in power—since political parties are subordinate to campaign donations, which mostly come from wealthy investors and corporations.
1932 United States presidential election	The severity of the Great Depression led people to favor a welfare state.	New capital-intensive industries such as banks and oil emerged powerful and, since they employ fewer workers, were able to tolerate labor unions and helped build the New Deal coalition on the side of Democrats.
1980 United States presidential election	People became dissatisfied with the welfare state in the wake of stagflation and favored free-market policies.	In the wake of stagflation and increased global competition, oil industries saw a conflict with labor and shifted support to Republicans.

== Case Studies ==
=== The New Deal ===
Ferguson uses the Investment Theory as the basis of an analysis of the New Deal in his 1984 paper "From Normalcy to New Deal: Industrial structure, Party Competition, and American Public Policy in the Great Depression", in which he argues that the New Deal policies became possible due to the changing nature of the American economy and the new coalitions of political investors that emerged as a result.

Ferguson argues that in the early years of the twentieth century American politics was dominated by a coalition of labor-intensive industries including steel, coal, and textiles, who opposed labor, and protectionist industries who supported the Republican Party. These industries were also joined by finance, who largely shared the support for trade tariffs and aggressive foreign policy. This coalition first began to split after the first world war as successful capital-intensive firms such as Standard Oil and General Electric began to emerge for whom labor issues were less pressing and who favored lower tariffs to stimulate world trade and open new markets. International banks also moved away from protectionist policies, as post-war recovery required European nations to export to America and required US banks to do so.

These firms went on to form the coalition that backed Franklin D. Roosevelt's New Deal policies, as their dominant position in the world economy made them the primary beneficiaries of the New Deal's free trade policies. While these new multinational corporations were better able to tolerate the pro-labour policies of the New Deal, they did not necessarily support it. Instead, Ferguson credits the rise of independent industrial unionism as the result of masses of American voters for the first time in US history successfully pooling their resources to become major investors in their own right.

== Campaign Finance Reform ==
Although the 'Investment Theory' is largely concerned with financial donations to political parties, Ferguson argues that the theory implies reform must look beyond campaign finance alone. While acknowledging a need for reform of campaign finance, 'if only to prevent more and more of society's resources going down a black hole', Ferguson suggests, that no matter how diligent the regulators are, wealthy investors will doubtless find new ways to corrupt the political system.

Instead, since the problem of money influencing politics stems from the cost of information, Ferguson argues the solution might come from finding ways for regular citizens to share these costs. Since it is inefficient for individuals or even groups of individuals to cope with this problem on an individual basis, Ferguson proposes that the cost must be subsidized by the state.

While the United States (and other nations) already subsidize some of these costs, for example in providing public finance to political parties, franking mail or providing staff to politicians, this rarely takes place on a scale that actually does the public any good. Instead, this funding merely subsidizes parties that the rich control, with the effect that public money merely leverages the contributions of major investors. The solution, then, is to apply the 'Golden Rule' to ordinary citizens by providing enough public support to allow ordinary members of the public to run for office and have a reasonable chance of winning. This would not only allow ordinary citizens and (seemingly) heterodox opinions to be heard but would also have the effect of limiting the harm that private financing can have.

== See also ==
- An Economic Interpretation of the Constitution of the United States
- Campaign finance
- Cash for access
- Electoral competition
- Elite theory
- Money loop
- Propaganda model – a similar theory, but concerning the media industry and public opinion.
