= Andrew Levine =

American philosopher (1944–2021)

Andrew Levine (November 28, 1944 – March 12, 2021) was an American political philosopher and commentator. After acquiring his PhD at Columbia University in 1971, he taught at the University of British Columbia and then at the University of Wisconsin- Madison where he taught for thirty years. In retirement, he served as a research professor at the University of Maryland-College Park and as senior scholar at the Institute for Policy Studies (Washington, D.C.), and he wrote as a news commentator for CounterPunch.org.

Levine's career focused on advancing left theory, situated in the libertarian socialist and analytical Marxist traditions. His work spanned a wide range of topics but centered on critiques of capitalism, the state, and religion. Levine also made contributions to the advancement of Marxist theory.

== Selected works ==
- The Politics of Autonomy: A Kantian Reading of Rousseau's Social Contract, University of Massachusetts Press, 1976.
- Liberal Democracy: A Critique of its Theory, Columbia University Press, 1982.
- The End of the State: A Marxist Reflection on an Idea of Rousseau's, Verso, 1987.
- Arguing for Socialism: Theoretical Considerations, Verso, 1988.
- Reconstructing Marxism: Essays on Explanation and the Theory of History, with Erik Olin Wright and Elliott Sober, Verso, 1992.
- The General Will: Rousseau, Marx, Communism, Cambridge University Press, 1993.
- Liberal Equality: From a "Utopian" Point of View, Cornell University Press, 1998.
- Engaging Political Philosophy: Hobbes to Rawls, Wiley-Blackwell, 2001.
- A Future for Marxism?: Althusser, the Analytical Turn and the Revival of Socialist Theory, Pluto Press, 2003.
- The American Ideology: A Critique, Routledge, 2004.
- Political Keywords: A Guide for Students, Activists, and Everyone Else, Wiley-Blackwell, 2007.
- In Bad Faith: What's Wrong with the Opium of the People, Prometheus, 2011.
