= Ellen M. Immergut =

Political scientist

Ellen Immergut
- Born: 1957
- Education: Harvard University
- Scientific career
- Thesis: The political construction of interests : national health insurance politics in Sweden, France and Switzerland, 1930-1970 (1987)

Ellen Margaretha Immergut (born 1957) is a political scientist known for her work on electoral and political competition on welfare state reforms, policy analysis, health politics in Europe, and the impact of right-wing populism on social policies.

== Education and career ==
In 1979, Immergut received her B.A. degree in Biochemistry and Molecular Biology at Harvard University. She received her M.A. in 1983 and her Ph.D. in 1987 from the Faculty of Sociology at Harvard University. From 1986 to 1987, she was a lecturer in political science at the Massachusetts Institute of Technology. This was followed by a position as assistant professor at the Faculty of Political Science at the Massachusetts Institute of Technology from 1987 to 1991. In 1991 she was promoted to associate professor and held the Ford International Development Chair. Between 1994 and 2002 she held the professorship for Political Theory in the Faculty of Administrative Science at the University of Konstanz. From 2002 to 2017 she was Professor for Comparative Analysis of Political Systems at the Humboldt University of Berlin. As of 2022 she is the head of the department of political and social science at the European University Institute.

In 2012, Immergut served on the international committee that reviewed the department of politics and government at Ben-Gurion University of the Negev and presented recommendations change the department, recommendations that were not followed and led to a plan to cancel politics classes at the university.

== Selected publications ==
As of 2022 Immergut's publications have over 7000 citations and she has an h-index of 22.

- Immergut, Ellen M. (1990). "Institutions, Veto Points, and Policy Results: A Comparative Analysis of Health Care *". Journal of Public Policy. 10 (4): 391–416. doi:10.1017/S0143814X00006061. ISSN 1469-7815. S2CID 55825849.
- Immergut, Ellen M. (1992). Health politics: Interests and Institutions in Western Europe. Cambridge [England]: Cambridge University Press. ISBN 9780521413350.
  - Reviewed in multiple journals including Journal of Public Health Policy, Contemporary Sociology, and Acta Sociologica.
- Immergut, Ellen M. (March 1998). "The Theoretical Core of the New Institutionalism". Politics & Society. 26 (1): 5–34. doi:10.1177/0032329298026001002. ISSN 0032-3292. S2CID 143375959.
- Immergut, Ellen M.; Schulze, Isabelle; Anderson, Karen M., eds. (2006). The handbook of West European pension politics. Oxford: Oxford University Press. ISBN 9780199291472.
