= History of the Working Families Party =

The Working Families Party is an American political party and the largest progressive populist party in the United States. The Working Families Party originated in 1998 among former New Party organizers and labor unions who sought an alternative party left of the Democratic Party that would not spoil liberal candidates.

== History ==
=== Origins ===
Dan Cantor was the labor coordinator for Jesse Jackson's 1988 presidential campaign. After the 1989 NYC mayoral election, Cantor and many labor unions felt betrayed by the Liberal Party of New York, who had endorsed Republican Rudy Giuliani. In 1990, Cantor and Joel Rogers published Party Time, a memo which argued that progressives should pursue an "inside/outside" strategy, working both "inside" and "outside" the Democratic Party. To that end, Cantor and Rogers formed the New Party in 1990, which hoped to use electoral fusion to push the Democrats leftward. True to their inside/outside strategy, the New Party endorsed some liberal Democrats, such as Barack Obama's successful 1996 run for Illinois Senate District 13, and some progressives, such as Danny Davis's successful 1996 run for Illinois's 7th congressional district, and several Green Party candidates.

In 1997, the New Party lost 6-3 in Timmons v. Twin Cities Area New Party, which found that state bans on electoral fusion did not violate the First Amendment. With their strategy deflated, the New Party became defunct by 1998. Instead of pushing for expanded fusion laws, Cantor sought to create a more traditional lib-left-labor coalition party which could compete in states with already existing strong electoral fusion laws, like New York. In 1998, Cantor organized the Working Families Party with a coalition of labor unions including CWA and Local 1199 of SEIU, advocacy groups including Citizen Action of New York, and community organizations including Association of Community Organizations for Reform Now (ACORN).

In 1998, WFP leaders endorsed Peter Vallone for Governor of New York, who was the Democratic Party candidate. WFP did so for both ideological and tactical reasons: Vallone roughly aligned with the party's policies, and Vallone was the most likely to gather 50,000 votes on the WFP ballot line, which would fulfill the legal requirement needed for the party to obtain automatic statewide ballot access for 2000–2004. Vallone won 1,570,317 votes, of which 51,325 on the WFP ballot line.

WFP also endorsed Chuck Schumer's original 1998 New York Senate campaign against Republican incumbent Al D'Amato, who Schumer successfully defeated in the 1998 election.

=== 2000–2004 ===
In November 2000, New York WFP endorsee Patricia Eddington won New York State Assembly district 3.

In the 2002 New York gubernatorial election, both of the other left-of-center minor parties failed to reach the 50,000 vote threshold for statewide automatic ballot access, which they had previously held: The Liberal Party, running Andrew Cuomo (who had withdrawn from the Democratic primary), and the Green Party, running academic Stanley Aronowitz. The Liberal Party dissolved in 2003 and the Greens never regained ballot access. This left the WFP as the only left-progressive minor party with a ballot line.

In 2002, the Connecticut Working Families Party (CTWFP) was formed by activist organizations including Association of Community Organizations for Reform Now (ACORN) and labor unions including American Federation of State, County and Municipal Employees (AFSCME), Communications Workers of America (CWA), and United Food and Commercial Workers (UFCW).

In the chaotic situation that followed the 2003 assassination of New York City councilman James E. Davis by political rival Othniel Askew, the slain councilman's brother Geoffrey Davis was chosen to succeed him in the Democratic primary in Brooklyn's 35th City Council district. As it became clear that Geoffrey Davis lacked his late brother's political experience, fellow Democrat Letitia James decided to challenge him in the general election. James prevailed, becoming the first minor party candidate elected solely on the WFP line.

=== 2005–2009 ===
In 2006, WFP began ballot access drives in California, Delaware, Massachusetts, Oregon, and South Carolina. The Oregon Working Families Party was formed in 2006.

In 2007, two Connecticut WFP endorsees, Luis Cotto and Larry Deutsch, won seats on the Hartford City Council on the WFP ballot line.

In 2008, South Carolina WFP convention endorsed five candidates for state and local office. One candidate, Eugene Platt, running for SC State House District 115, was also nominated by the South Carolina Green Party. The nomination of Michael Cone for the US Senate race, opposing incumbent Lindsey Graham, marked the first time the South Carolina party nominated anyone for statewide office.

In 2009, two candidates for the Board of Education in Bridgeport, Connecticut were also WFP-supported members of the board.

In 2009, Oregon WFP won a bill to legalize fusion voting in Oregon.

In August 2009, various media raised questions about the relationship between the WFP, a non-profit political party, and a for-profit private company called Data and Field Services (DFS). An editorial in The New York Times questioned whether DFS may be charging select clients below market rates for political services. In August 2010, the federal investigation into the party ended with no charges being filed, and no charges being referred to other law enforcement agencies.

=== 2010–2014 ===
In 2010, Connecticut WFP endorsed Dannel Malloy for governor, who ran jointly on the WFP and Democratic ballot lines. He received 26,308 votes as a Working Families candidate, more than the margin of victory, and securing ballot access for the party in that state.

In 2010, WFP recruited and trained thirteen candidates for seats on the New York City Council, in preparation for the 2013 New York City Council election. Twelve of these candidates won.

In 2011, Connecticut WFP won all three minority seats on the Hartford City Council, eliminating all Republican representatives. As of 2016, the WFP continues to hold all minority seats on the Hartford City Council. In 2011 Connecticut WFP director Jon Green received a $10,000 fine for failing to wear his badge identifying him as a lobbyist while performing lobbying efforts.

In 2012, Connecticut WFP backed Chris Murphy's successful race against billionaire Linda McMahon for the US Senate seat that was vacated by Joe Lieberman, supported SEIU/CCAG leader and organizer Christopher Donovan for Connecticut's 5th Congressional seat, as well as defeated a ballot initiative in Bridgeport, Connecticut, that would have abolished the elected board of education.

In 2014, New York WFP considered Zephyr Teachout, but ultimately re-endorsed Cuomo for New York governor despite dissatisfaction and frustration with his first term. However, Cuomo resisted the party's influence and sabotaged the party electorally. In 2010 more than 150,000 of his votes came on the WFP line. As of November 7, 2014, 120,425 votes came on the WFP line for Cuomo.

=== 2015–2019 ===
In 2015, New York WFP ran 111 candidates and won 71 local offices. In a February 2015 special election, Edwin Gomes won back their Connecticut State Senate seat, which they had previously represented as a Democrat. Gomes was the first candidate to win to state legislative office running solely on the WFP ballot line. Gomes would run as a Democrat in 2016. In a May 5, 2015, special election, NYWFP endorsee Diana Richardson won a New York State Assembly seat while running solely on the WFP ticket. Richardson would run as a Democrat and WFP endorsee in 2016, 2018, and 2020.

In December 2015, WFP endorsed Bernie Sanders in his campaign to win the 2016 Democratic Party presidential primaries. Sanders was WFP's first national endorsement. The endorsement followed a combined membership-drive and open poll among WFP enrolled members on whom to endorse for president in 2016. WFP spokesperson Dan Cantor said the results were "overwhelmingly" in favor of Sanders, with Sanders winning 87% of votes, Hillary Clinton 12%, and Martin O'Malley 1%. In 2016, after Hillary Clinton became the Democratic nominee, WFP endorsed her for the 2016 United States presidential election.

In an April 2017 special election, Connecticut WFP endorsee Joshua M. Hall won a Connecticut House of Representatives seat. Hall was the second candidate in WFP history to win state legislative office running solely on the WFP ballot line. Hall ran as a Democrat and WFP in 2018, then just as a Democrat from 2020 to 2024.

On October 3, 2017, WFP endorsee Randall Woodfin won the runoff election for Mayor of Birmingham, Alabama.

In April 2018, an endorsement of Cynthia Nixon over incumbent Andrew Cuomo in Cuomo's bid for a third term as New York governor caused a schism in the party. During this dispute, labor unions (including New York's biggest union Service Employees International Union and Communications Workers of America) indicated they would not support the party in the election. The withdrawal was believed would significantly hurt the party's finances which in 2018 was $1.7 million and statewide staff of about 15 people. The battle received considerable attention since there were concerns that Nixon might have drained enough votes from Cuomo in the general election to allow a Republican to be elected. On October 5, 2018, the WFP cleared Nixon from their ticket on the general election ballot and agreed to endorse Cuomo, who defeated Nixon in the Democratic primary, to preserve their ballot line placement.

While campaigning in the 2018 United States House of Representatives elections in New York, WFP candidate Liuba Grechen Shirley used campaign funds to pay a caregiver for her two young children. The FEC ruled that federal candidates can use campaign funds to pay for child care costs that result from time spent running for office. Grechen Shirley became the first woman in history to receive approval to spend campaign funds on child care.

In September 2019, WFP polled its membership whether to endorse Elizabeth Warren and Bernie Sanders in the 2020 Democratic Party presidential primaries. Warren won 60.91% of votes, Sanders 35.82%, and other options 3.27%. Therefore, WFP endorsed Warren on September 16, 2020. The poll was "weighted", with party leadership (56 people) and dues-paying members (about 90,000 people) each receiving 50% of the vote. WFP was widely criticized for not releasing the separate vote tallies for each group, which WFP leader Maurice Mitchell claimed was necessary "to maintain the nature of [the] secret ballot". WFP had released the membership vote in 2015, when 87% of members endorsed Bernie Sanders. Matt Bruenig argued in Jacobin that Sanders had likely won the party's membership vote. If one assumes that WFP refused to release results because Sanders won the membership vote, then Warren won 82%–100% of the leadership vote and only 22%–40% of the member vote. On March 9, 2020, after Elizabeth Warren exited the primary, WFP endorsed Bernie Sanders for president. On August 13, 2020, WFP endorsed Joe Biden as the presumptive Democratic nominee.

On November 5, 2019, Pennsylvania WFP endorsee Kendra Brooks won an at-large seat on Philadelphia City Council. The City Council reserves two seats for a minority party. In the last 40 years, this was the first time one of those seats went to a non-Democrat, non-Republican candidate.

=== 2020–2024 ===
In 2020, WFP launched a national program to endorse candidates in House and Senate and became an established party in 18 states.

In the 2021 New York City Democratic mayoral primary, New York WFP initially gave a ranked endorsement of Scott Stringer 1st, Dianne Morales 2nd, and Maya Wiley 3rd. After Stringer was accused of sexual assault, WFP rescinded his endorsement and issued a dual endorsement of Morales and Wiley. After Morales campaign staff alleged union busting, WFP endorsed only Wiley.

In 2023, Pennsylvania WFP endorsee Kendra Brooks won re-election to their Philadelphia City Council seat. In the same election, PAWFP candidate Nicolas O'Rourke won the other at-large seat. WFP had won both two seats reserved for minority party members on Philadelphia City Council, bringing the total of WFP councilmembers to two.

In October 2023, WFP released a statement responding to President Biden's address in which he reaffirmed U.S. support for Israel in the Gaza war and subsequent invasion of Gaza. In the statement, federal affairs director Natalia Salgado expressed support for an immediate ceasefire and criticized Biden for providing Israel with military aid, stating "there is no military solution to this conflict, and there never has been." In the WFP response to Biden's State of the Union in March 2024, delivered by Nicolas O'Rourke, the party reaffirmed their opposition to the Biden administration's policies in handling the humanitarian crisis in Gaza, calling again for an immediate and permanent ceasefire and denouncing the "arrogant and extreme-right Netanyahu Regime." The party would join the larger protest vote movements targeting Biden's re-election campaign in the Democratic primaries, with the New York chapter supporting an effort that urged voters to leave their ballots blank in the April primary; the final vote tally saw 40,000 blank ballots, 11.5% of the total vote share.

In July 2024, Biden suspended his re-election campaign following concerns about his health and endorsed Vice President Kamala Harris as his successor. The WFP officially endorsed Harris after she became the presumptive nominee, declaring "overwhelming support" to prevent Donald Trump from returning to the presidency.

In 2024, New Jersey WFP won an end to "the line", which gave a prioritized line on the election ballot for candidates supported by the Democratic or Republican party, which made challengers less visible. Afterwards, several WFP-endorsed candidates won their Democratic primaries.

=== 2025–present ===
In the 2025 Democratic primary for the election for New York City mayor, WFP sought to defeat former governor Andrew Cuomo. Because the election used ranked choice voting, New York WFP planned to announce an unranked slate, then a ranked slate after front-runners emerged. In March 2025, WFP's unranked slate endorsed city councillor Adrienne Adams, city comptroller Brad Lander, state assemblyman Zohran Mamdani, and state senator Zellnor Myrie. In May 2025, WFP's ranked slate put Mamdani 1st, Lander 2nd, Adams 3rd, Myrie 4th, and state senator Jessica Ramos 5th. After Ramos endorsed Cuomo, WFP struck Ramos from the list. WFP leadership said they would not endorse Cuomo, even if he won Democratic primary. Mamdani won the primary by 12 points over Cuomo. Mamdani later won the 2025 New York City mayoral election on the Working Families ballot line.

In February 2026, former New Jersey WFP executive director Analilia Mejia won the primary for the 2026 New Jersey's 11th district special election. In April, Mejia easily won the general election, defeating Republican nominee Joe Hathaway by 20 percentage points.

== State of the Union responses ==
Since 2019, WFP has recruited a major progressive elected official to deliver a response to the State of the Union address by the president of the United States, as is customary for the opposition party of the president:

- 2019 response to Trump: Mandela Barnes, 45th lieutenant governor of Wisconsin
- 2020 response to Trump: Ayanna Pressley, U.S. representative from MA-07
- 2021 response to Biden: Jamaal Bowman, U.S. representative from NY-16
- 2022 response to Biden: Rashida Tlaib, U.S. representative from MI-13
- 2023 response to Biden: Delia Ramirez, U.S. representative from IL-03
- 2024 response to Biden: Nicolas O'Rourke, Minority Whip of the Philadelphia City Council
- 2025 response to Trump: Lateefah Simon, U.S. representative from CA-12
- 2026 response to Trump: Summer Lee, U.S. representative from PA-12

== National leadership ==
From 2016 to 2018, the WFNC elected a chair and three co-chairs. From 2019–21, the WFNEC elected two co-chairs. From 2024–current, the WFNEC elects two co-chairs.

Years	Title	Name	Ref
2016–2018	WFNC Co-Chair	Ana Maria Archila	
2016–2018	WFNC Co-Chair	Bishop Dwayne Royster	
2016–2018	WFNC Co-Chair	Karen Scharff	
2016–2018	National Director	Dan Cantor	
2017–2019	WFNC Chair	Dan Cantor	
2018–current	National Director	Maurice Mitchell	
2019–2021	WFNEC Co-Chair	Dan Cantor	
2019–2021	WFNEC Co-Chair	Ana Maria Archila	
2024–current	WFNEC Co-Chair	Andrea Serrano	
2024–current	WFNEC Co-Chair	Jacob Feinspan	

== See also ==
- Working Families Party articles:
  - List of Working Families Party public officeholders
- American Left
