= Working Families Party =

Political party in the United States

- Abbreviation: WFP
- National director: Maurice Mitchell
- Founders: Bertha Lewis; Dan Cantor
- Founded: 1998; 28 years ago
- Merger of: New Party; Citizen Action; ACORN
- Preceded by: New Party
- Headquarters: New York City, New York, US
- Registered voters (July 2026): 69,363 (0.05%)
- Ideology: Left-wing populism; Progressivism; Factions: Democratic socialism; Green politics; Social democracy
- Political position: Center-left to left-wing
- Colors: Blue and white (formerly); Purple and orange (current)
- Seats in the Senate: 1 / 100 (Note: These counts consider all states, including in non-fusion states. US House and US Senate seats are taken from List of Working Families Party public officeholders, which attempts to include only "true" WFP endorsees (roughly, those endorsed during the Democratic primary) and exclude WFP endorsees of convenience (often Democrats in a swing district).)
- Seats in the House: 17 / 435
- Governorships: 1 / 3 (Note: These counts consider only CT, NY, and OR, where WFP uses electoral fusion to cross-endorse progressive Democratic Party candidates in a Dem-WFP fusion ballot. The counts includes all Dem-WFP fusion electeds. No WFP candidate for state legislature has been elected on a WFP line alone. For additional details: CT: Ballotpedia (House 47, Senate 15), see also 2024 Connecticut House of Representatives election and 2024 Connecticut Senate election.; NY: Ballotpedia (Assembly 50, Senate 28), see also 2024 New York State Assembly election and 2024 New York State Senate election. NY WFP also endorsed Kathy Hochul in 2022.; OR: Ballotpedia (House 16, Senate 3), see also 2024 Oregon House of Representatives election and 2024 Oregon State Senate election.)
- State upper house seats: 46 / 129
- State lower house seats: 113 / 361
- Other elected officials: see article

Election symbol

Website
- workingfamilies.org

WFP's logo from 1998–2018

Alternate WFP logo from 2018–present

The Working Families Party (WFP) is a progressive minor political party in the United States. WFP promotes for economic progressivism, left-wing populism, and cultural liberalism.

WFP was organized in 1998 as a successor to the New Party by a coalition of labor unions including CWA and SEIU, advocacy groups including Citizen Action, and community organizations including ACORN. Founded in New York, WFP has active chapters in nearly two dozen states. WFP has statewide ballot access in Connecticut, New York, and Oregon. WFP's most successful chapters are the New York Working Families Party (NYWFP) and Connecticut Working Families Party (CTWFP).

WFP supports economic progressive positions, including raising the minimum wage, universal paid sick leave, Medicare for All, expanding public education, reducing student debt, and progressive taxation. WFP supports cultural liberal positions, including abortion rights, LGBTQ rights, reducing incarceration, and a pathway to citizenship.

WFP rarely runs candidates on its own ballot line, instead pursuing electoral fusion with progressive Democratic Party candidates. Some notable WFP-endorsed elected officials include US representative Alexandria Ocasio-Cortez (NY-14), US senators Chris Murphy (CT) and Jeff Merkley (OR), New York governor Andrew Cuomo, Connecticut governor Dan Malloy, New York attorney general Letitia James, Chicago mayor Brandon Johnson, and New York City mayors Bill de Blasio and Zohran Mamdani.

As of 2026, the WFP is the 8th-largest political party in the United States by voter registration, below the Constitution Party. (Note: Voter registration ranks are listed here. This list excludes the many different "Independent" parties, with which many voters register in error, and which usually do not run any competitive candidates.) By vote share, the WFP is the 3rd-largest party in New York State, giving it "Row C", ahead of the Conservative Party of New York State. (Note: New York State ballot rows are decided by vote share in the last gubernatorial election. In 2010, WFP came 4th ("D"), behind the Conservatives. In 2014, WFP came 5th ("E"), behind the Greens. 2018, WFP came 4th ("D"), behind the Conservatives. In 2022, WFP 4th ("D"), behind the Conservatives. In 2026, WFP came 3rd ("C"), behind the Republicans.)

== History ==
=== Origins ===
Dan Cantor was the labor coordinator for Jesse Jackson's 1988 presidential campaign. After the 1989 NYC mayoral election, Cantor and many labor unions felt betrayed by the Liberal Party of New York, who had endorsed Republican Rudy Giuliani. In 1990, Cantor and Joel Rogers published Party Time, a memo which argued that progressives should pursue an "inside/outside" strategy, working both "inside" and "outside" the Democratic Party. To that end, Cantor and Rogers formed the New Party in 1990, which hoped to use electoral fusion to push the Democrats leftward.

In 1997, the New Party lost 6-3 in Timmons v. Twin Cities Area New Party, which found that state bans on electoral fusion did not violate the First Amendment. With their strategy deflated, the New Party became defunct by 1998.

Instead of pushing for expanded fusion laws, Cantor sought to create a more traditional lib-left-labor coalition party which could compete in states with already existing strong electoral fusion laws, like New York. In 1998, Cantor organized the Working Families Party with a coalition of labor unions including CWA and 1199SEIU, advocacy groups including Citizen Action of New York, and community organizations including Association of Community Organizations for Reform Now (ACORN). In 2002, WFP expanded to a second state with the Connecticut Working Families Party (CTWFP), formed by a coalition of labor unions including AFSCME, CWA, and UFCW, and community organizations also including ACORN.

Notable early New Party endorsements included Barack Obama's successful 1996 run for Illinois Senate District 13, Chuck Schumer's successful 1998 run for US Senate against Republican incumbent Al D'Amato, and Peter Vallone's 1998 run for Governor of New York, which won the WFP the 50,000 votes needed for automatic statewide ballot access. Vallone won 1,570,317 votes, of which 51,325 on the WFP ballot line. Bill de Blasio, the future mayor of New York City and friend of Cantor, was also endorsed and was present for the party's foundation.

In the 2002 New York gubernatorial election, both of the other left-of-center minor parties failed to reach the 50,000 vote threshold for statewide automatic ballot access, which they had previously held: The Liberal Party, running Andrew Cuomo (who had withdrawn from the Democratic primary), and the Green Party, running academic Stanley Aronowitz. The Liberal Party dissolved in 2003 and the Greens lost ballot access until 2010. This left the WFP as the only left-progressive minor party with a ballot line.

In 2009, Oregon WFP won a bill to legalize fusion voting in Oregon.

=== 2010s ===
In 2010, New York WFP endorsed Andrew Cuomo for New York governor against Republican Carl Paladino. Cuomo won 154,835 votes (3.32%) on the WFP line. In 2014, New York WFP considered endorsing Zephyr Teachout, but ultimately re-endorsed Cuomo after a heated public debate, despite dissatisfaction and frustration with his first term. Cuomo won 126,244 votes (3.31%) on the WFP line. Cuomo resented the reluctant endorsement and tried to sabotage the party electorally.

In May 2018, in his bid for a third term, Cuomo defeated Cynthia Nixon in the Democratic primary. In April 2018, New York WFP endorsed Nixon on the WFP line against Cuomo on the Democratic line, taking the dispute from the primary to the general election. This caused a schism, with CWA and SEIU, New York's biggest union, indicating they would not support the WFP line in the election, which posed to significantly hurt the party's finances. The unions feared the separate WFP line would drained enough votes from Cuomo to Nixon to spoil the election and allow Republican Marc Molinaro to win. In October 2018, the WFP cleared Nixon from their ticket and endorsed Cuomo, preserving their ballot line placement. Cuomo won 114,478 votes (1.88%) on the WFP line.

In December 2015, WFP endorsed Bernie Sanders in the 2016 Democratic Party presidential primaries. Sanders was WFP's first national endorsement. In a membership poll, Sanders won 87% of votes, Hillary Clinton 12%, and Martin O'Malley 1%. In 2016, after Hillary Clinton became the Democratic nominee, WFP endorsed her for the 2016 United States presidential election.

In September 2019, WFP polled its membership who to endorse in the 2020 Democratic Party presidential primaries. Elizabeth Warren won 60.91% of votes, Bernie Sanders 35.82%, and other options 3.27%, leading WFP to endorse Warren. The poll was "weighted", with party leadership (56 people) and dues-paying members (thousands of people) each receiving 50% of the vote. WFP was widely criticized for not releasing the separate vote tallies for each group. WFP had released the membership vote in 2015, when Sanders won 87%. Matt Bruenig argued that, if one assumes WFP refused to release results because Sanders won >50% of the membership vote, then Warren must have won only 22%–40% of the member vote but 82%–100% of the leadership vote. In March 2020, when Warren exited the primary, WFP endorsed Sanders. In August 2020, WFP endorsed Joe Biden as the presumptive Democratic nominee.

Every year since 2019, WFP has delivered a "working people's" response to the State of the Union address.

=== 2020s ===
In 2020, WFP launched a national program to endorse candidates in House and Senate and became an established party in 18 states.

In the 2021 New York City Democratic mayoral primary, New York WFP initially gave a ranked endorsement of Scott Stringer 1st, Dianne Morales 2nd, and Maya Wiley 3rd. After Stringer was accused of sexual assault, WFP rescinded his endorsement and issued a dual endorsement of Morales and Wiley. After Morales campaign staff alleged union busting, WFP endorsed only Wiley.

In 2024, New Jersey WFP won an end to "the line", which gave a prioritized line on the election ballot for candidates supported by the Democratic or Republican party, which made challengers less visible. Afterwards, several WFP-endorsed candidates won their Democratic primaries.

In the 2025 Democratic primary for the election for New York City mayor, WFP sought to defeat former governor Andrew Cuomo. Because the election used ranked choice voting, New York WFP planned to announce an unranked slate, then a ranked slate after front-runners emerged. In March 2025, WFP's unranked slate endorsed city councillor Adrienne Adams, city comptroller Brad Lander, state assemblyman Zohran Mamdani, and state senator Zellnor Myrie. In May 2025, WFP's ranked slate put Mamdani first, Lander second, Adams third, Myrie fourth, and state senator Jessica Ramos fifth. After Ramos endorsed Cuomo, WFP struck Ramos from the list. WFP leadership said they would not endorse Cuomo, even if he won Democratic primary. Mamdani won the primary by 12 points over Cuomo. Mamdani later won the 2025 New York City mayoral election on the Working Families ballot line.

== Political positions ==
WFP is a center-left to left-wing party. Most commentators describe WFP as a progressive party or a social democratic party. WFP has been frequently described as the "Tea Party of the left". In 2016, Bernie Sanders said: "The WFP is the closest thing there is to a political party that believes in my vision of democratic socialism". In 2025, WFP said "affordability and economic populism" are "our north star".

WFP has worked with both centrist Democrats and leftist Democrats. In 2014, WFP founder Dan Cantor, asked about WFP's support for centrist Democrats in swing districts, said "yeah, we help people win, but we will often fight them like hell when they are in office" and "who hates us the most" is "the center-right of the Democratic Party". WFP has endorsed candidates who competed against Democratic Socialists of America (DSA) members, and has also endorsed DSA members.

=== Economic issues ===
WFP member in NYC Fight for $15 rally, near Trump International Hotel

WFP supports universal healthcare through Medicare For All, negotiation to lower prescription drug prices, universal childcare, guaranteed paid sick leave, paid family leave, raising the minimum wage, stronger rights to organize unions, tuition-free college and student debt cancellation, increased progressive taxation, raising corporate taxes, increasing taxes on wealthy people, including a billionaire' wealth tax, and affordable housing via removing exclusionary zoning and tenant rights against price gouging and housing discrimination.

WFP supports public investment in infrastructure and green jobs, the creation of public banks, and public ownership stakes in corporations receiving bailouts. Its 2020 agenda proposed government buyouts of oil and gas companies to accelerate the transition to renewable energy, alongside a just transition for affected workers.

=== Social issues ===
Maurice Mitchell and Laura Flanders discuss the Movement for Black Lives and how economic inequality and social justice cannot be separated

WFP supports abortion rights, reducing incarceration and shifting resources from policing, prisons, and immigration detention toward schools, housing, healthcare, and employment. It supports marijuana decriminalization. It supports tribal sovereignty.

WFP supports a pathway to citizenship for undocumented immigrants, protections from deportation including the DREAM Act, and access to work permits.

=== Democratic reform ===
WFP protester in 2017, calling for filibuster of Neil Gorsuch's nomination to the Supreme Court

WFP strongly supports electoral fusion in the United States, which allow one candidate to be cross-endorsed by multiple parties. WFP sees fusion as a First Amendment free speech issue, and a way to weaken the two-party system by allowing minor parties to influence major parties. WFP uses electoral fusion laws in Connecticut, New York, and Oregon. For example, in the 2025 New York City mayoral election, Zohran Mamdani was endorsed by both the Democratic Party and WFP, and appeared on the ballot under both the Democrat label and Working Families label. WFP hopes to leverage this support to push candidates to support progressive reforms.

WFP supports public financing of election campaigns, including public matching funds for small campaign donations.

=== Foreign policy ===
WFP favors international cooperation and diplomacy. In 2024, it called for an immediate and permanent ceasefire in Gaza, an end to unrestricted military aid to Israel, and diplomatic efforts to free hostages and end the occupation. The party condemned both the October 7 Hamas attack and Israel's campaign of collective retribution.

== Structure and composition ==
=== National committees ===
WFP slowly developed a national leadership as it expanded from New York (1998), Connecticut (2002), and Oregon (2006) to a national party. In 2013, WFP state leaders created the National Advisory Board (NAB), an informal twice-a-year meeting. In 2016, the NAB formalized as the Working Families National Committee (WFNC), WFP's highest governing body. The WFNC selects an Executive Committee (WFNEC) for daily business and two WFNEC co-chairs. WFP's National Director is Maurice Mitchell, following Dan Cantor (1998–2018).

=== Membership ===
WFP has two forms of dues-paying membership: Individual members joined the WFP, pay their annual dues, and vote in local WFP chapter and national WFP business. Affiliate members joined a WFP-affiliated labor union or community organization which pays dues on their behalf. WFP uses a federated party model, in which both WFP chapters (of individual members) and affiliate member organizations send representatives into WFP leadership. In turn, WFP leadership votes on WFP endorsements with a weighted voting scheme, roughly one vote per 100 individual members or one per 2,000 affiliated members.

=== Voter registration ===
As of July 2026 the Working Families Party has 69,363 (0.05%) registered voters, the 8th-highest in the United States. WFP has 59,617 registered voters (0.48%) in New York; 8,355 (0.27%) in Oregon; and 318 (0.01%) in Connecticut.

== Officeholders ==
Many federal, state, and local candidates have run and won on an Democratic-WFP electoral fusion ballot line. Many federal, state, and local candidates have run and won on the Democratic ballot line with WFP endorsement. Of those who have run and won on the WFP ballot line, the vast majority are local officials, including those on the Philadelphia City Council and Hartford City Council. These elected officials are listed at list of Working Families Party public officeholders.

== State parties ==
- Connecticut Working Families Party
- New York Working Families Party
- Oregon Working Families Party

== See also ==
- Working Families Party articles:
  - History of the Working Families Party
  - List of Working Families Party public officeholders
- Progressivism in the United States
- Democratic Socialists of America
