= List of Working Families Party public officeholders =

The Working Families Party (WFP) is a progressive political party. WFP very rarely runs candidates solely on the WFP ballot line. Instead, WFP has two main strategies for supporting candidates:

1. In states with electoral fusion, WFP maintains a statewide ballot line, which it usually uses to cross-endorse progressive Democrats. The Connecticut WFP, New York WFP, and Oregon WFP pursue this strategy, similar to the Vermont Progressive Party.
2. In other states, WFP endorses and fundraises for progressive Democrats in the primary. This is similar to Richmond Progressive Alliance or the Democratic Socialists of America.

The WFP endorses a very large number of candidates each cycle. The WFP endorsed 1036 candidates in 2017, "over 1,000" in 2019, "over 700" in 2024, 766 in 2025, and 730 in 2026.

WFP often endorses incumbent or moderate Democrats in general elections, including some WFP had campaigned against in the primary. WFP usually does so either to ensure the WFP ballot line meets a minimum-vote threshold or to avoid spoiling the liberal vote against a Republican candidate. (Note: In 1998, WFP leaders endorsed Peter Vallone, in part because he roughly aligned with WFP priorities, but mainly to get 50,000 votes on the WFP ballot line and obtain automatic statewide ballot access. In 2018, after strongly supporting Cynthia Nixon in the Democratic primary, WFP endorsed Andrew Cuomo for governor both because WFP members wanted to avoid spoiling the Democrats into a Republican victory and because WFP needed to get 50,000 votes in the gubernatorial election to keep its ballot line. In 2022, Pennsylvania WFP endorsed John Fetterman for the general election after endorsing Malcolm Kenyatta in the Democratic primary.)

Therefore, this page only lists candidates in three categories:

- Candidates who won on the WFP ballot line, not a Dem-WFP fusion line
- Candidates endorsed by the WFP in the primary for their first successful election
- Progressive candidates endorsed by the WFP in multiple election cycles

Rows marked in blue identify candidates who ran on the WFP line in one election, then dropped the line to run as a Democrat.

== Elected on Democratic or fusion line ==
=== US Congress ===
Member	Term start	Term end	Dist	Ballot line	Caucus (Note: Ideological caucus membership: New Democrat Coalition (New Dem) and/or Congressional Progressive Caucus (Prog).)	Notes
Lateefah Simon	Jan 3, 2025	Current	CA-12	Democratic Party	Prog	In the 2024 primary for CA-12, California WFP endorsed Simon to succeed Barbara Lee. WFP endorsed Simon again in 2026. In 2025, Simon delivered the WFP's State of the Union response.
Greg Casar	Jan 3, 2023	Current	TX-35	Democratic Party	Prog	In the 2022 primary for TX-35, Texas WFP endorsed Casar. WFP endorsed Casar again in 2024 but not 2026.
Gabe Vasquez	Jan 3, 2023	Current	NM-2	Democratic Party	Prog	In the 2022 primary, New Mexico WFP did not endorse Vasquez. In the general, WFP endorsed Vasquez each cycle 2022–24, but not 2026.
Jasmine Crockett	Jan 3, 2023	Current	TX-30	Democratic Party	Prog	In the 2022 primary for TX-30, Texas WFP endorsed Crockett. WFP did not endorse Crockett either cycle 2024-26.
Delia Ramirez	Jan 3, 2023	Current	IL-3	Democratic Party	Prog	In the 2022 primary for IL-3, Illinois WFP endorsed Ramirez. WFP endorsed Ramirez again each cycle 2024-26. In 2023, Ramirez delivered the WFP's State of the Union response.
Summer Lee	Jan 3, 2023	Current	PA-12	Democratic Party	Prog	In the 2022 primary for PA-12, Pennsylvania WFP endorsed Lee against Steve Irwin. WFP endorsed Lee again each cycle 2024-26. In 2026, Lee delivered the WFP's State of the Union response.
Maxwell Frost	Jan 3, 2023	Current	FL-10	Democratic Party	Prog	In the 2022 primary for FL-10, Florida WFP canvassed and fundraised for Frost. In the general, WFP endorsed Frost in 2022 but not either cycle 2024-26.
Andrea Salinas	Jan 3, 2023	Current	OR-6	Democratic and Working Families (fusion)	New Dem and Prog	In the 2022 primary for OR-6, Oregon WFP endorsed Salinas. WFP did not endorse Salinas either cycle 2024-26. In the general, Salinas ran on the Dem-WFP ballot line in 2022, but on the Dem line 2024–26.
Becca Balint	Jan 3, 2023	Current	VT-AL	Democratic Party	Prog	In the 2022 primary, the Vermont WFP endorsed Balint against Molly Gray. Balint also attempted to win the Vermont Progressive Party nomination, which would have yielded a Dem-VPP fusion ballot line, but was unsuccessful. WFP did not endorse Balint either cycle 2024-26.
Pat Ryan	Sep 13, 2022	Current	NY-19; NY-18	Democratic and Working Families (fusion)	New Dem	In the 2022 special primary for NY-19, New York WFP endorsed Ryan. WFP endorsed Ryan again each cycle 2024-26. In the general, Ryan ran on a Dem-WFP line 2022–26.
Jamaal Bowman	Jan 3, 2021	Jan 3, 2025	NY-16	Democratic and Working Families (fusion)	Prog	In the 2020 primary for NY-16, New York WFP endorsed Bowman over incumbent Eliot Engel, who had previously run on the WFP ballot line in 2018. WFP endorsed Bowman again in 2022 and 2024. When Bowman lost to George Latimer, WFP did not endorse Latimer in the general. In the general, Bowman ran on a Dem-WFP line over 2020–22. In 2021, Bowman delivered the WFP's State of the Union response.
Mondaire Jones	Jan 3, 2021	Jan 3, 2023	NY-17	Democratic and Working Families (fusion)	Prog	In the 2020 primary for NY-17, New York WFP endorsed Jones. In the 2020 general, Jones ran on a Dem-WFP line. In 2022, after redistricting, Jones lost the District 10 Democratic primary to Dan Goldman. In the 2024 District 17 election, Jones ran again. In early June 2024, Jones endorsed George Latimer against WFP endorsee Jamaal Bowman, leading WFP to withdraw fundraising and canvassing support for Jones, though it did not withdraw Jones' endorsement. In late June, Jones lost the WFP primary to a conservative activist. (Note: In late June 2024, conservative activist Anthony Frascone registered several hundred voters on the WFP line in order to win the ballot away from Mondaire Jones. WFP called Frascone a "MAGA plant" whose actions yielded a "surprise primary", because WFP rarely has contested primary elections, and most WFP voters are registered Democrats. Frascone won the primary.) As a result, Jones did not appear on the WFP line in the general, which he lost to Republican Mike Lawler.
Jahana Hayes	Jan 3, 2019	Current	CT-5	Democratic and Working Families (fusion)	New Dem	In the 2018 primary for CT-5, Connecticut WFP endorsed Hayes over Mary Glassman. WFP endorsed Hayes again each cycle 2020-26. In the general, Hayes ran on a Dem-WFP line 2018–24 but not 2026.
Alexandria Ocasio-Cortez	Jan 3, 2019	Current	NY-14	Democratic and Working Families (fusion)	Prog	In the 2018 primary for NY-14, New York WFP endorsed AOC against incumbent Joe Crowley. WFP endorsed AOC each cycle 2020–26. In the general, AOC ran on a Dem-WFP line 2018–26.
Ayanna Pressley	Jan 3, 2019	Current	MA-7	Democratic Party	Prog	In the 2018 primary for MA-7, Massachusetts WFP endorsed Pressley against incumbent Mike Capuano. WFP endorsed Pressley again each cycle 2020–22 but not 2024–26. In 2020, Pressley delivered the WFP's State of the Union response.
Ilhan Omar	Jan 3, 2019	Current	MN-5	Democratic Party	Prog	In the 2018 primary for MN-5, Minnesota WFP did not endorse Omar. WFP endorsed Omar each cycle 2020–24, but not 2026.
Max Rose	Jan 3, 2019	Jan 3, 2021	NY-11	Democratic and Working Families (fusion)	New Dem	In the 2018 primary, the New York WFP endorsed Rose. In the 2018 general, Rose ran on a Dem-WFP-Women's Equality ballot line. In the 2020 general, WFP did not endorse Rose, who ran on a Democratic-Independence ballot line, and lost to Republican Nicole Malliotakis. In the 2022 primary, WFP opposed Rose, instead backing Brittany Ramos DeBarros. Rose won the Democratic primary. In the 2022 general, WFP offered its endorsement and ballot line, but Rose rejected both, citing his opposition to "defunding the police". Rose again lost to Malliotakis.
Joe Morelle	Nov 13, 2018	Current	NY-25	Democratic and Working Families (fusion)	New Dem	In the 2018 primary and special primary for NY-25, New York WFP endorsed Morelle. WFP endorsed Morelle each cycle 2020–26. In the general, Morelle ran on a Dem-WFP line 2018–26.
Kathleen Rice	Jan 3, 2015	Jan 3, 2023	NY-4	Democratic and Working Families (fusion)	New Dem	In the 2014 primary for NY-4, the New York WFP endorsed Rice against Kevan Abrahams. WFP endorsed Rice again in 2014, but not 2016–20. In the general, Rice ran on the Dem-WFP ballot line in 2014, but not 2016–20.
Hakeem Jeffries	Jan 3, 2013	Current	NY-8	Democratic and Working Families (fusion)	Prog	In the 2012 primary for NY-8, New York WFP endorsed Jeffries against incumbent Ed Towns, who later dropped out. WFP endorsed Jeffries again over 2012–20 but not 2022–26. In the general, Jeffries ran on a Dem-WFP line 2012–22. but not 2024–26.
Chris Murphy	Jan 3, 2013	Current	CT-Sen	Democratic and Working Families (fusion)	n/a (Note: In the Senate, Murphy was not a member of any caucuses.)	In the 2006 primary for CT-5, Murphy ran unopposed, but Connecticut WFP endorsed Murphy before a contested primary would've been held. WFP endorsed Murphy again each cycle 2008–10. In the general, Murphy ran on a Dem-WFP line 2006–10. In the 2012 primary for Senate, WFP endorsed Murphy against Susan Bysiewicz. WFP endorsed Murphy again 2018–24. In the general, Murphy ran on a Dem-WFP line 2012–24.
Chris Murphy	Jan 3, 2007	Jan 3, 2013	CT-5	Democratic and Working Families (fusion)	New Dem	In the 2006 primary for CT-5, Murphy ran unopposed, but Connecticut WFP endorsed Murphy before a contested primary would've been held. WFP endorsed Murphy again each cycle 2008–10. In the general, Murphy ran on a Dem-WFP line 2006–10. In the 2012 primary for Senate, WFP endorsed Murphy against Susan Bysiewicz. WFP endorsed Murphy again 2018–24. In the general, Murphy ran on a Dem-WFP line 2012–24.
Yvette Clarke	Jan 3, 2007	Current	NY-11; NY-9	Democratic and Working Families (fusion)	Prog	In the 2006 primary for NY-11, New York WFP endorsed Clarke. WFP endorsed Clarke each cycle from 2008–22 but not 2024–26. In the general, Clarke ran on the WFP ballot line over 2006–2024 but not 2026.
Hillary Clinton	Jan 3, 2001	Jan 3, 2009	NY-Sen	Democratic and Working Families (fusion)	n/a (Note: In the Senate, Clinton was not a member of any caucuses.)	In the 2000 primary for Senate, New York WFP supported Clinton, who spoke at WFP's first national convention. WFP endorsed Clinton again in 2006. In the general, Clinton ran on a Dem-WFP line each cycle 2000–2006.

In 2022, WFP endorsed the entire "Squad".

Some edge cases are noted below. (Note: Edge cases and common misconceptions: In the 2024 NY-26 special election to replace Brian Higgins, there was no Democratic primary. The Erie County Democratic Committee selected Tim Kennedy at their convention. Kennedy ran on a Dem-WFP fusion line in the general.; In the 2020 Senate elections in Georgia, the WFP did not endorse Jon Ossoff or Raphael Warnock in the jungle primary, but endorsed both in the runoff election.; In the 1998 Senate election in New York, the newly-born WFP endorsed Chuck Schumer's successful Senate run against Republican incumbent Al D'Amato. In 2022, Schumer said: "I was one of the first candidates they've ever endorsed, and we've worked together ever since, and they have always endorsed me, which I appreciate.")

Governors

Name	State	Term start	Term end
Deb Haaland	NM	Jan 1 2027	Governor-Elect

== Elected on WFP ballot line ==
=== State officials ===
==== State legislators ====
===== Former (3) =====
Name	State	Chamber	District	Ballot line	Term start	Term end	Notes
Joshua M. Hall	CT	House	7	Working Families	Apr 28, 2017	Sep 1, 2019	Hall won a special election on the WFP ballot line in 2016. He ran on the Democratic and WFP lines as a fusion candidate in 2018, then as a Democrat each cycle 2020–2026.
Diana Richardson	NY	Assembly	43	Working Families	May 6, 2015	Feb 4, 2022	In the 2015 special election, the local Democratic Party endorsed Guillermo Philpotts, who failed to file the proper paperwork, leaving the Democratic ballot line empty. New York WFP endorsed Diana Richardson, who won solely on the WFP ballot line. Richardson ran on a Dem-WFP ballot line in 2016, 2018, and 2020.
Ed Gomes	CT	Senate	23	Working Families	Feb 27, 2015	Jan 4, 2016	Gomes won a special election on the WFP ballot line for a seat he had previously held as a Democrat, but for which he had lost the Democratic nomination. Gomes ran as a Democrat in 2016.

=== Local officials ===
==== City councils and county commissions ====
===== Current (6) =====
Name	State	Area	Office	District	Ballot line	Term start	Term end	Notes
Tamika Stewart	NY	Newburgh	City Council	3	Working Families	Jan 1, 2026	Dec 31, 2029	Stewart ran solely on the WFP ballot line.
Nicole Watts	NY	Onondaga County	County Legislature	9	Working Families	Jan 1, 2026	Dec 31, 2027	Watts ran solely on the WFP ballot line.
Nicolas O'Rourke	PA	Philadelphia	City Council	At-Large	Working Families	Jan 1, 2024	Dec 31, 2027	O'Rourke ran solely on the WFP ballot line. The PCC reserves two seats for minor parties. After O'Rourke won, the WFP had two seats and the GOP had none. In 2024, O'Rourke delivered the WFP's State of the Union response.
Alex Thomas	CT	Hartford	City Council	At-Large	Working Families	Jan 1, 2024	Dec 31, 2027	Thomas ran solely on the WFP ballot line.
Kendra Brooks	PA	Philadelphia	City Council	At-Large	Working Families	Jan 6, 2020	Dec 31, 2027	Brooks ran solely on the WFP ballot line. The PCC reserves two seats for minor parties. After Brooks won, the WFP and GOP each had one seat.
Joshua Michtom	CT	Hartford	City Council	At-Large	Working Families	Jan 1, 2020	Dec 31, 2027	Michtom ran solely on the WFP ballot line.

===== Former (5) =====
Name	State	Area	Office	District	Ballot line	Term start	Term end	Notes
Tiana Hercules	CT	Hartford	City Council	At-Large	Working Families	Jan 1, 2022	Dec 31, 2023	Hercules ran solely on the WFP line.
Wildaliz Bermudez	CT	Hartford	City Council	At-Large	Working Families	Jan 1, 2016	Dec 31, 2021	Bermúdez ran solely on the WFP line. Bermúdez resigned in 2021 was succeeded by Tiana Hercules, also a WFP candidate.
Luis Cotto	CT	Hartford	City Council	At-Large	Working Families	Jan 1, 2008	Jul 31, 2012	Cotto ran solely on the WFP line. The HCC has nine seats, but prohibits any party from running more than six. Cotto resigned in 2012 and was succeeded in his term by Joel Cruz, also a WFP candidate. After Cotto and Deutsch won their seats, the WFP had two seats on the council and the GOP had one.
Larry Deutsch	CT	Hartford	City Council	At-Large	Working Families	Jan 1, 2008	Dec 31, 2020	Deutsch ran solely on the WFP line. The HCC has nine seats, but prohibits any party from running more than six. Deutsch was succeeded by Joshua Michtom, who also ran solely on the WFP ballot line. After Deutsch and Cotto won their seats, the WFP had two seats on the council and the GOP had one.
Letitia James	NY	New York City	City Council	35	Working Families	Jan 1, 2004	Dec 31, 2009	James won a 2003 special election for New York City's 35th City Council district running solely on the WFP ballot line, after having run as a Democrat for that seat. James ran on the Democratic and WFP lines as a fusion candidate in 2005 and 2007. James ran solely on the Democratic line in 2009 and later elections.

== See also ==
- Working Families Party articles:
  - History of the Working Families Party
- Other lists:
  - List of socialist members of the United States Congress
  - List of elected socialist mayors in the United States
  - List of Green politicians who have held office in the United States
  - List of Democratic Socialists of America public officeholders
  - List of Communist Party USA members who have held office in the United States
