= Dan Cantor =

American activist

Daniel Cantor

1st National Director of the Working Families Party
- In office 1998–2018
- Preceded by: Position created
- Succeeded by: Maurice Mitchell

National Director of the New Party
- In office 1992–1998 Co-leading with Joel Rogers
- Preceded by: Position created
- Succeeded by: Position abolished

Personal details
- Born: 1955 (age 70–71) Levittown, New York
- Party: Working Families Party; New Party
- Spouse: Laura Markham
- Education: Wesleyan University
- Occupation: Community activist, labor leader

Daniel Cantor is an American political organizer known for organizing labor and community figures to advocate for social democratic reforms in the Alinskyite Social Democrat tradition. He is most well known for being the co-founder and long-time leader of the Working Families Party (WFP), a social democratic and progressive third party founded in New York in 1998.

== Early life and education ==
Cantor was born in 1955 in Levittown, New York, to an Ashkenazi Jewish family. Cantor's father co-owned a local auto-parts store. His mother was active in the formation and growth of the local public library system. Cantor has stated that his interest in politics began when, as a teenager, his uncle gifted him a subscription to The Progressive.

Bob Master, a close childhood friend of Cantor and the northeastern political director for the Communications Workers of America, stated that Cantor was elected student body president during his time at MacArthur High School. Cantor enrolled at Wesleyan University, but left in his sophomore year to work on an Israeli Kibbutz. When he returned, Cantor became a student activist. After his graduation in 1977, Cantor joined ACORN and studied the writings of Richard Cloward and Frances Fox Piven.

== Early political career ==
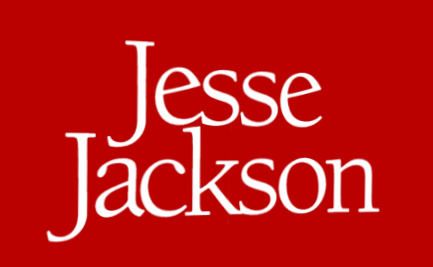
Logo of Jesse Jackson's 1988 presidential campaign, which Cantor worked on

As a community organizer for ACORN, Cantor organized interracial alliances in Stuttgart, Arkansas, and St. Louis, Missouri, to pressure local governments for better services. In Detroit and New Orleans, he led an effort to organize unions of fast-food and hotel workers. In 1984, Cantor joined the National Labor Committee in Support of Democracy and Human Rights in El Salvador, part of a network of groups that opposed US policy in Latin America. In the mid-1980s Cantor worked for the Unitarian Universalist Veatch Program as well as Jesse Jackson's 1984 and 1988 presidential campaigns.

== New Party ==
Cantor's honeymoon in 1989 in the UK coincided with a surge of support for Green Party candidates running for seats in the European Parliament. Press coverage of the returns caused his wife to wonder aloud why there were not similar third parties in the United States. Cantor recounted reciting what the usual argument about the barriers to third party formation in the U.S. Upon his return, the Liberal Party of New York endorsed Republican Rudy Giuliani for the 1993 New York City mayoral election, infuriating the leftist community activists in the city and Cantor initially sought to stage a hostile takeover of the Liberal party, but decided against it. Instead Cantor got into contact with Joel Rogers, a law professor at the University of Wisconsin, about the viability of third parties and what one would have to do to make their own. Since the 1970s leftists in America followed the teachings of Michael Harrington and Tom Hayden to vote for the Democratic party as the lesser of two evils and at the time of the Liberal party's endorsement of Giuliani, pressure groups such as the Democratic Leadership Council where pushing the Democratic party in a center-right direction, especially with the success of the pro-Business Clinton administration. All of this led to Cantor and Rodgers concocting a plan to use fusion voting in states that used the practice to create a leftist and progressive third party, not to stand on its own, but rather to offer alternative candidates in Democratic primaries in order to shift the Democrats in a leftist direction.

The pair circulated a letter in local newspapers and raised $300,000 to found the New Party (NP) in 1992. The goal of the party was to challenge the constitutions of states where fusion voting was not legal in order to bring the practice nationwide. The party opened offices in Milwaukee, Little Rock, and Chicago. However, in 1997, the Eighth Circuit Court of Appeals unanimously struck down a NP effort to change the constitution of Minnesota to permit the practice, effectively killing the party. Cantor and Rodgers officially disbanded the NP in 1998. Cantor had moved from Ann Arbor to New York City in 1996, and was starting a family and was uninterested in moving again for his job. Instead Cantor worked to tap Jon Kest, ACORN's executive director, to run for Governor of New York in 1998. Cantor used every connection he gained in his lifetime of community activism to try and get Kest 50,000 votes to appear on the ballot for the next four years under New York State election laws and as such, founded the Working Families Party (WFP) in 1998. Although the party's eventual endorsed candidate, Democrat Peter Vallone Sr., was defeated, the new party garnered 51,325 votes and as such secured future ballot access.

== Working Families Party ==
The Working Families Party logo from 1998 to 2020, often associated with Cantor's leadership

Cantor largely modeled the WFP after the American Labor Party, which the party is often called the "ideological heir" to, and the Liberal Party, focusing on grassroots campaigning and canvassing to impact the Democratic establishment, as well as supporting community and union leaders financially in their campaigns to public office that they otherwise wouldn't be able to afford. The party saw immediate backing from ACORN, United Auto Workers, Citizen Action, and the Communications Workers of America.

Cantor hired Bill Lipton, another ACORN veteran, as its first organizing director. In the 2001 New York City mayoral election the party backed Mark Green, who made Lipton his field director in Queens. In 2003 the party elected its first standalone politician, Letitia James to the New York City council.

Cantor and various media outlets have described the WFP as the left winged answer to the Tea Party movement, with Cantor going so far as to directly comparing the WFP to the tea party in a 2010 speech stating that "The tea party is saying government is a waste, or evil, even. Our view is that government will be as good as we make it, by electing people who stand for a certain set of values we all share about decency and equality and opportunity." Additionally Cantor stated that "[the WFP is] not a Ralph Nader party" and Cantor nor the party intend to split votes, rather to shift the Democrats to the left.

Cantor and the party have been active in efforts to abolish various drug laws and outlaw the practice of stop and frisk going so far as to support David Soares in his election as District Attorney of Albany County, which put the party in a national spotlight. Soares, who is Black in a 95% White district, had never heard of the WFP prior to his campaign, and worked with the group to run a grassroots, door knocking based campaign that saw him win the election with more than 26% more of the vote than his opponent. After this victory Cantor had the party focus more on progressive candidates in Upstate New York, a traditional Republican stronghold. By 2009 WFP members in the New York City Council had begun to organize themselves as the Progressive Caucus to emulate the Congressional Progressive Caucus.

The 2008 Occupy Wall Street movement "supercharged" the WFP, its number of supporters and their devotion to the cause, leading to a snowballing of local electoral victories that forced Democrats in the City Council to shift further to the left.

The party maintained a close relationship with Mayor Bill de Blasio, with Cantor and the WFP running his 2009 election as Public Advocate. During which the New York Post ran over 100 articles attacking Cantor and the WFP as part of a larger anti-Socialist culture war. Namely, Bob McManus, a columnist for the Post, called Cantor and the WFP's "real goal is to pick the public’s pocket" on behalf of the labor groups they represent. Additionally, mayor Michael Bloomberg called the WFP the “labor-electoral complex.” Cantor, meanwhile, focused on local issues; childhood education, affordable college, and increased park and library budgets. At this time Cantor also gave several interviews in the New York media clarifying that the WFP was not a party exclusively for unions, advocating strictly for union members, but rather sought to "advance the broad social good," and that their candidates aren't begotten to the party, rather to their constituents.

In 2013 with an interview with Bill Moyers, alongside Jonathan Soros, Cantor reflected on his longstanding political alliance with Soros and his Friends of Democracy PAC. The pair argued for extensive political finance reform to effectively overturn Citizens United v. FEC at a local level. Cantor argued for "one person one vote, not one dollar one vote" and to construct limits over the amount of money in politics. Cantor argued that local, grassroots donations should be the sole metric of if a campaign is viable so that the politician is held responsible to their constituents instead of their donors.

2013 would serve as a high-point for Cantor's political influence and the reach of the WFP, seeing longtime ally de Blasio elected mayor, a member of the WFP, Kenneth P. Thompson, was elected attorney general of Brooklyn as well as 12 of the 13 candidates the WFP ran for city council winning election, bringing their total to 20. Additionally, the party had begun seriously expanding outside of New York, with the Bridgeport school board being majority WFP, and with a growing movement in Northern New Jersey, especially in Bergen County. Also, the group began opening affiliates in Oregon, Pennsylvania, Maryland, Washington D.C., and Wisconsin. In these elections Cantor and the party raised $7.8 Million, with only $600,000 coming from sources other than individual donors.

Also at the time Cantor began to champion the "Candidate Pipeline Project" which he stated trained over 1,000 potential candidates with the goal of sending 8 more WFP members to the New York State Assembly every year until the Republican party is utterly defeated and removed from all public office, creating a new two party system between the Democratic Party and the WFP.

From 2011 to 2014 Cantor wrote 11 op-eds in the Huffington Post mostly reflecting the WFP's ongoing political campaigns as well as advocating for socialistic economic and social programs.

The party and Cantor's influence entered a period of decline during and after the 2014 New York gubernatorial election where Cantor initially sought to run a WFP candidate against Andrew Cuomo, perceiving him as a conservative due to his tax cuts for the wealthy, tax breaks for banks and expansion union-free charter schools during his first term. Additionally, the party distrusted Cuomo due to the high amount of wealthy corporate donors contributing to his campaign. The party eventually backed Cuomo after he let New York City increase its minimum wage independently of New York State. During the election, it was also revealed that Cantor and the WFP had paid protesters to attend a picket line pretending to be striking Wendy's employees. This scandal, coupled with the back and forth with Cuomo led to the progressive left-wing of the Democratic party to begin distrusting the WFP, resulting in the party's stagnation.

People wonder about the Wizard of Oz and what’s happening behind the curtain in New York politics ... The answer is: It is Cantor working it.

— Emmanuel Caicdeo, WFP staff

Additionally at this time, the WFP had begun to wear out its welcome with leftists, with the socialist magazine Jacobin denouncing the WFP due to its support of centrist and "corporate" Democrats as a betrayal to the working class.

In 2017 Cantor helped organize anti-Trump healthcare protests, organizing "sit-ins" in numerous Republican offices after Trump signaled that he would be replacing the Affordable Care Act. The protests took place in 21 different states and specifically targeted Mitch McConnell, Jeff Flake, Marco Rubio, Rob Portman, Pat Toomey, and John Boozman. Cantor stated that “Trumpcare has never been about health care, it’s a naked attempt to steal health care from millions of Americans in order to pay for massive tax cuts for the richest people in history. It's despicable. Even Republican senators must know in their hearts that this is wrong. But still they press forward."

Cantor stepped down as the head of the WFP after nearly 20 years leaving the party in 2018, being succeeded by Maurice Mitchell who led local Black Lives Matter rallies. During the transition Cantor lauded Mitchell's achievements and stated that he was the best candidate to turn the WFP from a New York party to a national party.

Shortly before his departure from the party in 2018 Cantor described the WFP as an "independent faction" of the Democratic party comparing it to the Tea Party movement in relation to the Republican Party, as opposed to a true third party like the Green Party. At the time of his departure the WFP had committees in 19 states and in 2017 endorsed more than 1,000 candidates for state and local office.

== Later political career ==
Since his departure from the WFP Cantor has worked as an advisor for The Action Lab, a socialist community activist group that promotes better connectivity with Socialists and cross-support for various campaigns.

In 2019 Cantor co-wrote an op-ed in The Nation supporting the practice of Fusion voting, the reason why the WFP has been successful in New York, stating that the practice helps the United States strive towards "a more perfect union" and touting Ruth Bader Ginsburg's support of the practice. Cantor also highlighted the practice allowing the Populist Party and the American Labor Party to more directly impact other parties manifestos by showcasing that their stances where what the voters supported. Cantor closed the op-ed attacking Andrew Cuomo's proposal to ban the practice in New York, and calling on the practice to be adopted federally nation-wide.

Cantor has outlined his personal political belief as that of accountability and community interaction. That residents of a district should know their local state representatives and senators, and that they should not only have a relationship with them, but also hold their representative accountable. Cantor also stated in a 2018 interview with The New York Times that he was inspired to form the WFP and engage in political activism so that there was a progressive left-wing alternative to the religious right, specifically citing his own Jewish upbringing as a counterbalance to right winged evangelical Christians.

== Personal life ==
Cantor married Laura Markham, co-founder of the alt-weekly newspaper Detroit Metro Times, in 1989.
