= Cipher (band) =

American hardcore punk band

- Origin: Long Beach, New York, U.S.
- Genres: Hardcore punk, metalcore, rapcore
- Years active: 1996–2011, 2014, 2017
- Label: Uprising Records
- Members: Moe Mitchell; Chris Fry; Krys Maniecki; Mark Dollar; Dan Bianco; Zach Barnett; Kevin Falco; Moe Watson
- Past members: Danny Bobis (deceased); Edward Lally; Jay Cordella; Mike Signa; Ben Yazak
- Website: www.facebook.com/cipheronline

Cipher is an American hardcore punk band that formed in 1996 in Long Beach, New York, United States. Cipher's core line-up consisted of Maurice "Moe" Mitchell (vocals), Danny "Cipher" Bobis (drums), Chris Fry (guitar) and Krys Maniecki (bass).

== History ==
The band's earliest demos were released when members were high school juniors. These releases were marked by a noticeably more metal and progressive sound than their contemporaries in the Long Island Hardcore scene. Another distinct element of Cipher's sound was Moe Ciphers vocals which were expressed as rhythmic, staccato yells rather than screams which drew some comparisons to Hip hop. Cipher's music addressed socio-political activism, hardcore scene politics and identity.

Later releases became progressively pointed in their political critiques and complex in their musical structure. The release of the EP Protoculture marks a distinct change in artistic direction for Cipher. The four song recording was the first time Cipher put together a compilation of work written for the express purpose of being released as a unit. The outcome was a treatment on race, the trans-Atlantic slave trade, spiritual indecision, and the role of the individual in changing her/his reality.

Cipher has released three demos (Serial, 99 cent Demo, 2), one EP (Protoculture), one 6 inch EP (Burnt Halos), and one music video (for "Reaching Higher States" off the Antidote album). The band has become highly regarded in the Hardcore underground as a consistent voice of radical political dissent and musical experimentation. In 2003, the band was featured in James Spooner's cult classic documentary Afro-Punk. In 2005, Cipher released their first non-DIY, nationally distributed release, Children of God's Fire. Children of God's Fire has gone on to become an emblematic record in the band's history and an influential record, seen as a needed departure from the apolitical recordings popular in mainstream heavy music.

Since their 2005 release Children of God's Fire, the band had several line-up changes with the exception of founding members Danny Bobis and Maurice Mitchell.

In 2010, the band released their second major release, The Joyous Collapse. The record is Cipher's attempt at chronicling the internal contradictions and struggles of daily life, our many overlapping identities, and the many forms of oppression we encounter in society. To support the release, the band embarked on a 48 date DIY Summer Tour from the east coast to the west coast of North America. The band suffered many hardships during this tour, most notably their van breaking down along the way.

On July 24, 2011, founding member Danny Bobis went missing while surfing in Indonesia. On July 28, 2011 after four days of searching Bobis' body was found. Cipher went on hiatus for a while. On August 23, 2014, Cipher performed at the Afropunk Festival with both newer and older members headed by founding member Maurice Mitchell. The group also did an interview for Afropunk stating, "I know Danny was feeling every single moment of it. I know Danny was rocking with us."

On July 27, 2017, many of the past members reunited to perform at THIS IS HARDCORE in Philadelphia.

== Politics ==
The band's earliest recordings included anti-authoritarian statements and metaphysical themes. Although never explicitly a "straightedge band", all four original band members either identified as straightedge or led a drug-free lifestyle, independent of straightedge culture and politics. To this day Moe Cipher continues to lead straightedge / drug-free lifestyles. Danny Cipher continued this lifestyle until his passing. Although not explicitly a "vegan or vegetarian band", three of the four original band members were either vegan or vegetarian. In 1998 Cipher's music took on a distinctly revolutionary racial consciousness and an explicitly anti-racist bent. By 2000, Cipher's politics had become more oppositional in nature and more urgent in its push for dramatic social change. At this point, Cipher's politics had matured to a balanced challenge of race, class, and gender in contemporary society. The most noticeable shift in this period of Cipher's political development was a pronounced gender critique. This enhanced feminist critique is most noticeable on songs like "Woman," featured on Antidote. By 2005 Cipher had adopted on a "total-liberation" ethos, exposing a need for total social upheaval in order to develop a new society that respected the autonomy of all living beings, human and animal as well as the Earth's environment. Cipher's political message promotes animal rights although not all the current members of Cipher are vegan. This represents a continuation of the politics Cipher had in its inception when most members were vegan or vegetarian. Additionally, their understanding of a revolutionary future would not necessitate all humanity to align under ridged guidelines of behavior. Cipher suggests a path to total liberation in stages. An initial stage would require organizing with people where ever they are in their political consciousness. Such a posture relies on points of commonality and solidarity rather than points of difference.

Moe Mitchell has since become a progressive activist, serving as the chairman of the Working Families Party.

== Discography ==
=== Studio EPs/albums ===
- 1996: Recognize EP
- 1998: Protoculture EP
- 2001: Antidote
- 2005: Children of God's Fire
- 2010: The Joyous Collapse

=== Demo albums ===
- 1996: Serial
- 2000: Burnt Halos

=== Compilation appearances ===
- Koi Records – Scream for Help! "Punk & Hardcore Bands 4 Gulf Coast Animals" (Vinyl record featuring such bands as Most Precious Blood, Cattle Decapitation and H_{2}O)
