= Maurice Mitchell (activist) =

American activist and musician

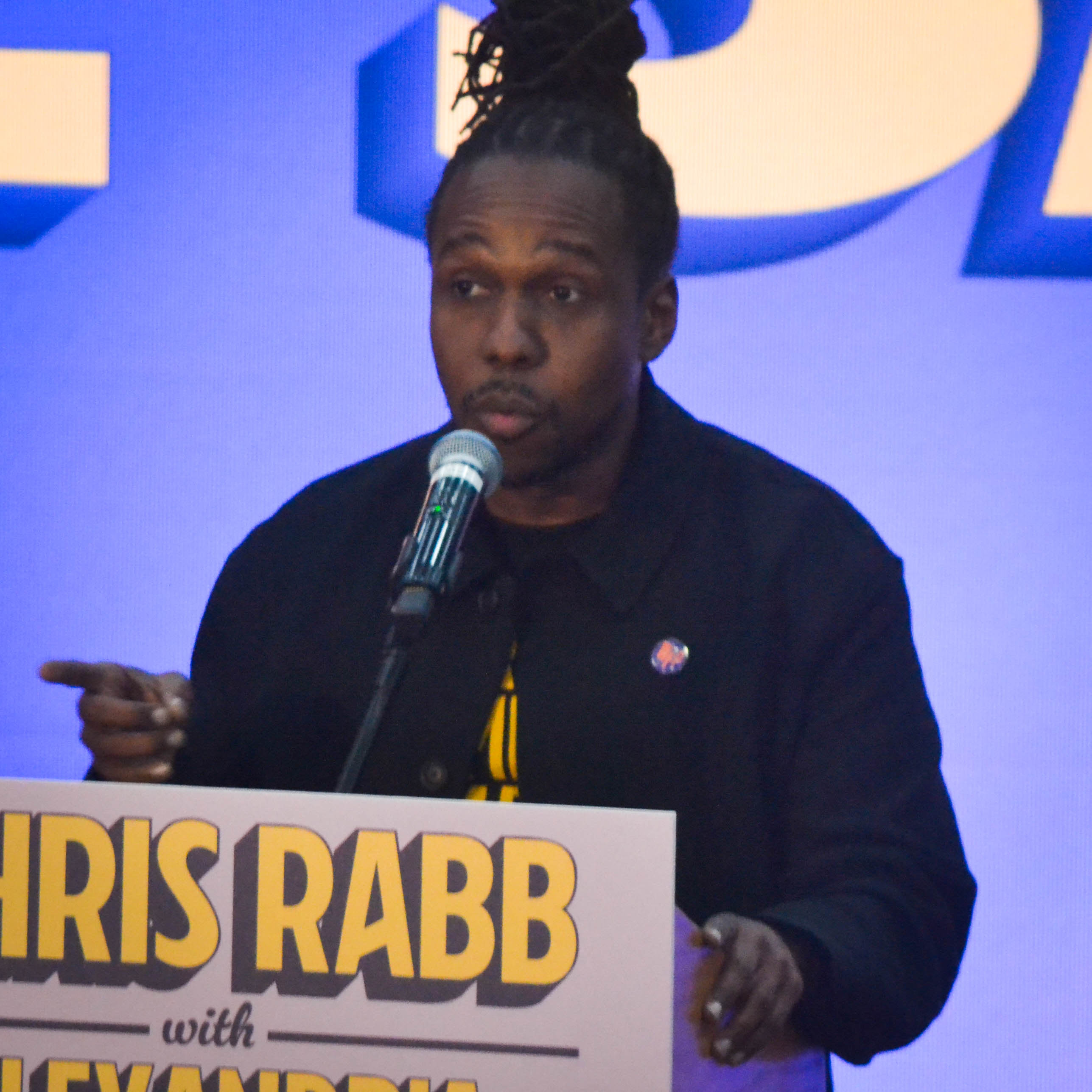
- Mitchell in 2026

2nd National Director of the Working Families Party
- Incumbent
- Assumed office April 2018
- Preceded by: Dan Cantor

Personal details
- Born: July 25, 1979 (age 47) Long Beach, New York, U.S.
- Party: Working Families
- Education: Howard University (BS)

Maurice "Moe" Mitchell is an American activist, rapper, and musician. He is currently serving as the National Director of the Working Families Party, a progressive political party known for cross-endorsing candidates through fusion voting. Mitchell has served in the role since April 2018. He succeeded Dan Cantor. He also was the lead vocalist for the hardcore punk band, Cipher.

== Early life and education ==
Mitchell was born and raised in Long Beach, New York. He is the son of Caribbean immigrants. In high school, Mitchell was a member of the Long Island Student Coalition for Peace and Justice. Mitchell earned a Bachelor of Science degree in political science from Howard University.

== Career ==
After college, Mitchell returned to Long Island, where he worked for the Long Island Progressive Coalition. Mitchell then worked as an organizing director for Citizen Action. During the Ferguson unrest after the shooting of Michael Brown, Mitchell temporarily relocated to Ferguson, Missouri, to work with other activists.

In addition to his work in activism and political organizing, Mitchell is a founding member of the hardcore punk band, Cipher, established by Mitchell and several high school classmates in 1996.

In 2020, as a result of the COVID-19 pandemic, Mitchell and the Working Families Party had to recall waves of organizers and canvassers.

== Personal life ==
In 2012, Mitchell's home in Long Beach, New York, was destroyed during Hurricane Sandy. Mitchell is vegan.

MF Doom (Daniel Dumile) and DJ Subroc (Dingilizwe Dumile), famous MC's/rappers, were Mitchell's older cousins.
