= New Party (United States) =

- Founder: Dan Cantor; Joel Rogers
- Founded: 1992
- Dissolved: 1998
- Preceded by: Citizens Party
- Succeeded by: Working Families Party
- Headquarters: 88 Third Ave., Suite 313; Brooklyn, NY; 11217
- Ideology: Progressivism
- Political position: Left-wing

The New Party was a third political party in the United States that tried to reintroduce the practice of electoral fusion. In electoral fusion, the same candidate receives nomination from more than one political party and occupies more than one ballot line. Fusion was once common in the United States but is now commonly practiced only in New York State, although it is allowed by law in seven other states. The party was active from 1992 to 1998. (There had been an earlier, unrelated New Party in 1968 that ran Eugene McCarthy for president.)

== Founding ==
The New Party was founded in the early 1990s by Dan Cantor, a former staffer for Jesse Jackson's 1988 presidential campaign, and by political science, sociology and law professor Joel Rogers as an effort to break with the largely unsuccessful history of progressive third parties in the United States. Their strategy was to run candidates only where they had a reasonable chance of winning, and to nominate on their ballot line (or where this was not legally possible, to endorse) the candidate they favored more from another party.

After a false start in New York, the New Party built modestly successful chapters in several states. Some of these chapters (such as those in Chicago and Little Rock, Arkansas) had their main bases of support in the low-income community organizing group ACORN, along with some support from various labor unions. Other chapters (such as those in Minneapolis; Missoula, Montana; Montgomery County, Maryland; and Dane County, Wisconsin) received institutional support from a variety of other labor unions and community organizations. These chapters built local political organizations that ran or endorsed candidates, primarily in local non-partisan races but with occasional forays into Democratic Party primaries or (more rarely) traditional third party-style independent candidacies as well. Some New Party chapters introduced the idea of signed candidate contracts (saying the candidate agreed with the party's principles and would meet with party members after election) before endorsement, to encourage accountability after election—this was criticized by some of the party's detractors. Party chapters were also active between elections, pressuring elected officials to pass legislation on issues such as living wages and affordable housing.

== Influence ==
In Madison, Wisconsin and some other cities, the New Party partnered with Green Party candidates.

The New Party endorsed Barack Obama in his successful 1996 run for the Illinois Senate.

Although the party's founders hoped to foster a shift in the United States toward electoral fusion, they were not successful in doing so. Their hopes rested largely on the U.S. Supreme Court case Timmons v. Twin Cities Area New Party. In 1997, the Court, in a 6–3 decision, upheld the Minnesota ban on cross-endorsing candidates, rejecting the New Party's argument that electoral fusion was a right protected by the First Amendment's freedom of association clause.

After the Timmons case, the New Party quickly declined and several chapters disaffiliated. Perhaps the only and certainly the most successful surviving local chapter, known as Progressive Dane, remains active and relevant in Dane County, Wisconsin. New Party founder Daniel Cantor and other key staff members left to found the Working Families Party of New York (1998), an organization which has had considerable success in building a New Party-style organization within New York state, and which now has expanded into other states that have fusion voting.
