= Timmons v. Twin Cities Area New Party =

- Supreme Court of the United States

Argued December 4, 1996 Decided April 28, 1997
- Full case name: Timmons, Acting Director, Ramsey County Department of Property Records and Revenue, et al. v. Twin Cities Area New Party
- Docket no.: 95-1608
- Citations: 520 U.S. 351 (more) 117 S.Ct. 1364
- Argument: Oral argument
- Opinion announcement: Opinion announcement

Holding
- States may prohibit candidates from being listed on the ballot as the candidate of more than one party.

Court membership
- Chief Justice William Rehnquist Associate Justices John P. Stevens · Sandra Day O'Connor; Antonin Scalia · Anthony Kennedy; David Souter · Clarence Thomas; Ruth Bader Ginsburg · Stephen Breyer

Case opinions
- Majority: Rehnquist, joined by O'Connor, Scalia, Kennedy, Thomas, and Breyer
- Dissent: Stevens, joined by Ginsburg; Souter (Parts I and II)
- Dissent: Souter

Laws applied
- U.S. Const. amends. I, XIV

Timmons v. Twin Cities Area New Party, 520 U.S. 351 (1997), is a United States Supreme Court case holding that state governments may prohibit candidates from being listed on the ballot for more than one party. In deciding that candidates do not have a First Amendment freedom of association to represent multiple parties, this case limited the spread of electoral fusion in the United States.

== Background ==
Founded in 1992, the New Party sought to revive electoral fusion voting in the United States, in which parties with distinct platforms can nominate the same candidate to pool their voters. Without fusion voting, third-parties forced to nominate separate candidates risk a spoiler effect of drawing votes away from their preferred choice among the two major parties.

When the Twin Cities Area New Party, a regional affiliate, tried nominating Andy Dawkins as their candidate for a Minnesota House of Representatives election in April 1994, they were told that because Dawkins was already nominated by the Minnesota Democratic–Farmer–Labor Party, state law prevented him from representing additional parties.

In 1994, the US District Court for the District of Minnesota sided with the state in a summary judgement that federal courts should not impede state authority over the election process. In 1996, the US Court of Appeals for the Eighth Circuit reversed that judgement, holding that despite the Seventh Circuit upholding a Wisconsin ban on fusion voting in 1991, this Minnesota law was an unconstitutional infringement on the New Party's First Amendment freedom of association.

== Supreme Court ==
Writing for the majority, Chief Justice William Rehnquist relied on the Supreme Court's 1992 upholding of Hawaii's ban on write-in candidates in Burdick v. Takushi to frame this Minnesota law as an acceptable state regulation of the electoral process. Citing Burdick, the majority opined that "ballots serve primarily to elect candidates, not as forums for political expression."

In response to Laurence Tribe's oral argument that Minnesota had explicitly passed its fusion voting ban to limit the emergence of third parties relying on popular slogans or candidates, rather than popular ideas, Rehnquist considered the law within the state's strong interest in stabilizing its elections.

=== Dissents ===
Associate Justices John Paul Stevens and David Souter wrote separate dissents, the former of which was fully joined by Ruth Bader Ginsburg and partially by Souter. Stevens' dissent argued that a third party's unburdened right to advocate for its preferred major party candidate was insufficient because the relevance of a political party depends on its electoral success. Further, Stevens believed that states concerned about voter confusion should instead raise the signature threshold for parties to appear on the ballot.

Souter's dissent argued that because Minnesota had not presented the preservation of the two-party system as its state interest in this law, the majority should not have considered Tribe's reference to the legislative record. However, Souter cited statistics on declining party affiliation during the 1990s to argue that states may have an interest in maintaining the two-party system for governmental stability.

== Legacy ==
The ruling led to the collapse of the New Party with its founders moving onto the Working Families Party, which focuses on pushing progressive policies in New York, one of the few states that allows fusion voting. The only remaining regional affiliate of the New Party is the Progressive Dane, which operates in Dane County, Wisconsin.

In 2025, the New Jersey Superior Court, Appellate Division ruled in In re Malinowski that just as Tom Malinowski did not have a federal First Amendment right to represent both the Democratic and Moderate parties in the 2022 US House of Representatives election for New Jersey's 7th congressional district, he was not entitled to represent both parties under the Constitution of New Jersey. Besides noting that the 1947 convention for the current New Jersey state constitution rejected a provision allowing fusion voting, the Superior Court noted that Indiana, Montana, North Dakota, Ohio, Pennsylvania, Washington, and Wisconsin courts have all treated anti-fusion laws as consistent with their state constitutions in cases between 1896 and 2019.
