= Moderate Party (New Jersey) =

- Chairperson: Michelle Garay
- Spokesman: Rick Wolfe
- Founders: Rick Wolfe, Michelle Garay
- Founded: June 2022; 4 years ago
- Headquarters: Alexandria Township, New Jersey
- Ideology: Fiscal conservatism Anti-establishment; Electoral fusion
- Political position: Center

Website
- njmoderateparty.org

The Moderate Party is a minor third party in New Jersey founded by centrist former members of the Republican Party, on the grounds that the party has shifted too far right following the election of Donald Trump in 2016 and the storming of the Capitol on January 6. The party also seeks to attract moderate Democrats who are unsatisfied with the party's shift to the left.

== Foundation ==
The party was founded in the summer of 2022 in preparation for the election of that year. The party was co-founded by Rick Wolfe, former Republican mayor of East Amwell Township and Michelle Garay, former Republican mayor of Alexandria Township with Wolfe going on to be the party's spokesman and Garay the chairwoman. After the foundation of the party, Wolfe stated in interviews that the intention of the party was "to reach out to New Jersey's 'exhausted majority'," to offer a home to voters who dislike how far the Republicans have moved to the right and Democrats to the left and to "be the vehicle that brings these candidates to the center." Wolfe claims that New Jerseyites want candidates who will support their communities and values and not participate in a larger nationwide culture war. New Jersey is historically inhospitable to third parties, and is the only state in the nation that has not had a qualified minor party in more than one hundred years.

== Electoral fusion ==
The centerpiece of the party's strategy is to restore fusion voting in New Jersey, and eventually implement the practice nationally. Fusion would allow a candidate to appear on a ballot multiple times for multiple parties allowing voters to support a candidate even if they disagree with that candidate's major party affiliation. The practice had been legal in New Jersey for decades throughout the 19th century and early 20th century and was expressly authorized under the State's landmark Geran Law, passed under the direction of then Governor Woodrow Wilson. However, the practice was outlawed in New Jersey in a series of laws passed in 1921 and 1922. The party hopes to revive fusion via litigation that seeks to have the state's 1922 ban declared an unconstitutional abridgement of the right to free association.

The party hopes that by bringing back fusion voting that it would incentivize voters to vote with their conscience more so than party affiliation, allowing Democrats to vote for centrist Republicans and Republicans to vote for centrist Democrats without having to vote for the opposing party directly.

Electoral fusion is a widely discussed policy proposal. For example, Lee Drutman of New America has supported the initiative, saying that it "gives voters the ability to clearly signal: 'stop the hyper-partisan fighting and work together.'" The party has been supported in its lawsuit by Protect Democracy. The party's lawsuit has also been supported by former Republican governor Christie Todd Whitman and former Democratic Senator Robert Torricelli who wrote, "the systemic benefits of fusion could be substantial, by tempering the destabilizing effects of hyper-polarization and by incentivizing parties and candidates to compete for voters in the middle."

== 2022 election ==
In 2022, the party made its first, and so far only, nomination in the 7th congressional district race, of incumbent Representative Tom Malinowski. He welcomed its support, writing that it represented an “alliance between Democrats of all stripes, independents and moderate Republicans.” However, the party's nominating petition for Malinowski was ruled invalid by Tahesha Way, the Secretary of State of New Jersey.

The New Jersey Republican State Committee and Malinowski's opponent, Thomas Kean Jr., criticized the Moderate Party, claiming that the party was created in an attempt to subvert voters. The party was criticized for benefiting from an expenditure made by the titular political action committee, the Moderate Party Independent Fund, which received funds from Nancy Pelosi's House Majority PAC. The party has also been criticized by the National Republican Campaign Committee for its association with Sue Altman, former director of the New Jersey Working Families Party. Kean defeated Malinowski, 51.5% to 48.5%. In 2024 Kean would be re-elected, beating Altman, who was the Democratic candidate, 51.9% to 46.3%.

== Post 2022 election ==
Following the defeat of Malinowski in the 2022 election, the party insisted that their mission had not ended and re-focused their efforts on a lawsuit to overturn the state's ban on fusion. Their efforts to restore fusion voting have been bolstered by a poll for Fairleigh Dickinson University which stated that 56% of New Jerseyites supported restoring the practice in the state. Additionally, another poll by Braun Research, this time on behalf of the New America Foundation, found that 68% of New Jerseyites support fusion voting, and 81% of New Jerseyites are discontent with the two party system.

The party's lawsuit to implement fusion voting was filed in July 2022 with the New Jersey Republican party motioning to have the case dismissed altogether. The New Jersey Attorney General, Matthew Platkin, has also called for the suit to be dismissed. However, on May 2, 2023, a three-judge panel rejected the calls for dismissal and announced the lawsuit can proceed to the State Supreme Court. The lawsuit saw a surge of bipartisan support in June and July 2023 with the American Civil Liberties Union of New Jersey, Brennan Center for Justice, Cato Institute, the New Jersey Libertarian Party, and five former members of congress, including former House Minority leader and 2004 Presidential Candidate Dick Gephardt (D-MO), voicing their support for the lawsuit and the establishment of fusion voting in the state. The party would see further support for their cause from Christine Todd Whitman, Jon Corzine, John Farmer Jr., Andrew Sidamon-Eristoff, and the League of Women Voters.

The Party's suit for fusion voting filed a request for direct certification to the New Jersey Supreme Court on 20 July 2023. The New Jersey Supreme Court rejected hearing the case on September 12, instead leaving the issue in the hands of the appellate division. The Moderate Party presented its oral arguments before the Superior Court of the New Jersey Appellate Division on December 10, 2024. Specifically, the party argued that banning fusion voting deprived New Jerseyites of their "right to vote, right to equal protection, right to free speech and political association, and right to assemble."

On February 26, 2025, the New Jersey Superior Court, Appellate Division ruled in In re Malinowski that just as Tom Malinowski did not have a federal First Amendment right to represent both the Democratic and Moderate parties in the 2022 US House of Representatives election for New Jersey's 7th congressional district, he was not entitled to represent both parties under the Constitution of New Jersey. Besides noting that the 1947 convention for the current New Jersey state constitution rejected a provision allowing fusion voting, the Superior Court noted that Indiana, Montana, North Dakota, Ohio, Pennsylvania, Washington, and Wisconsin courts have all treated anti-fusion laws as consistent with their state constitutions in cases between 1896 and 2019. The court also noted the United States Supreme Court ruling in Timmons v. Twin Cities New Party which holds that the U.S. Constitution does not prohibit state bans on fusion voting.

The party again appealed the ruling to the New Jersey Supreme Court in June 2025. The Supreme Court declined to hear the case in December. The League of Women Voters of New Jersey came out against the court's decision to not hear the case.

== Party platform ==
Besides fusion voting, the parties beliefs as outlined on their website are as follows:

- Eliminate political extremism
- Support bipartisanship
- Tackle local instead of national issues
- Protect the foundations of American democracy
- Fiscal conservatism
- Immigration reform
- "Facts-based" legislation
- Government transparency
