= Sick leave in the United States =

Paid sick leave laws in the United States Paid sick leave is required Sick leave is not required and state law preempts local requirements No sick leave laws

The United States federal government requires unpaid leave for serious illnesses, but does not require that employees have access to paid sick leave to address their own short-term illnesses or the short-term illness of a family member. The United States is one of few high-income countries not to guarantee universal paid sick leave.

The share of private sector jobs with paid sick leave policies has increased from 63 to 77 percent over the period 2010 to 2023; mostly as a result of state-level requirements to provide sick leave. A number of states and localities do require some or all employers to provide paid sick leave to their workers. Some jurisdictions allow for "safe leave", the use of sick leave for health and safety reasons related to domestic violence, sexual assault, stalking, and other forms of violence and harassment.

== Availability ==
Senator Kamala Harris talks about the importance of sick leave during the COVID-19 pandemic.

A 2009 analysis from the Bureau of Labor Statistics (BLS) found that around 39 percent of American workers in the private sector do not have paid sick leave. Around 79 percent of workers in low-wage industries do not have paid sick time. Most food service and hotel workers (78 percent) lack paid sick days.

A 2008 survey reported that 77 percent of Americans believe that having paid sick days is "very important" for workers. Some workers report that they or a family member have been fired or suspended for missing work due to illness.

A 2020 paper found that requiring paid sick leave in the US likely increased overall well-being. When paid sick leave is required by law, workers tended to take two more days off work each year.

== Unpaid sick leave ==
The US requires unpaid leave for serious illnesses through the Family and Medical Leave Act (FMLA). This law requires most medium-sized and larger employers to comply and, within those businesses, covers employees who have worked for their employer for at least 12 months prior to taking the leave.

== Paid sick leave ==
As of 2026, 21 states and Washington DC require paid sick leave, while 29 states do not. 18 states preempt local governments from requiring paid sick leave. Some localities require paid sick leave.

States with paid sick leave laws
State	Date of taking effect	Legalization method
Connecticut	January 1, 2012	Public Act No. 11-52 signed into law by Governor Dannel Malloy on July 1, 2011.
California	January 1, 2015 / July 1, 2015	Legislation signed into law by Governor Jerry Brown in 2014.
Massachusetts	July 1, 2015	Question 4 passed by voters in November 2014.
Oregon	January 1, 2016	Legislation (SB 454) signed into law by Governor Kate Brown in 2015.
Vermont	January 1, 2017	HB 187 signed into law by Governor Peter Shumlin on March 9, 2016.
Arizona	July 1, 2017	Proposition 206 (Fair Wages and Healthy Families Act) passed by voters in November 2016.
Washington	January 1, 2018	Initiative 1433 passed by voters in November 2016.
Rhode Island	July 1, 2018	Legislation signed into law by Governor Gina Raimondo in 2017.
Maryland	February 11, 2018	In January 2018, the State Legislature overrode a veto of Governor Larry Hogan.
New Jersey	October 29, 2018	Legislation signed by Governor Phil Murphy on May 2, 2018
Michigan	March 29, 2019	In September 2018, the State Legislature approved a ballot initiative, effectively making it law.
Nevada	January 1, 2020	Legislation signed by Governor Steve Sisolak on June 12, 2019.
Maine	January 1, 2021	Legislation (LD 369) signed into law by Governor Janet Mills on May 28, 2019.
New York	January 1, 2021	Legislation signed into law by Governor Andrew Cuomo on April 3, 2020.
Colorado	January 1, 2021 / January 1, 2022	Legislation signed into law by Governor Jared Polis on July 14, 2020.
New Mexico	July 1, 2022	Legislation signed into law by Governor Michelle Lujan Grisham on April 8, 2021.
Illinois	January 1, 2024	Legislation signed into law by Governor J. B. Pritzker on March 13, 2023.
Minnesota	January 1, 2024	Legislation signed into law by Governor Tim Walz on May 24, 2023.
Alaska	July 1, 2025	Measure 1 passed by voters in November 2024.
Nebraska	October 1, 2025	Initiative 436 passed by voters in November 2024.
Virginia	July 1, 2027	Legislation signed into law by Governor Abigail Spanberger on May 20, 2026.

=== Alabama ===
Alabama does not require paid sick leave and preempts local governments from requiring it.

=== Alaska ===
All employees earn one hour of paid sick leave for every 30 hours worked. Employees of companies with 15 or more employees can accrue up to 56 hours a year, while employees of smaller companies can only accrue 40 hours a year.

=== Arizona ===
All full-time, part-time, and temporary workers earn one hour of paid sick leave for every 30 hours worked. Employees of companies with 15 or more employees can accrue up to 40 hours a year, while employees of smaller companies can only accrue 24 hours a year. Companies are only required to allow employees to use their time off after being employed for 90 days.

=== Arkansas ===
Arkansas does not require paid sick leave and preempts local governments from requiring it.

=== California ===
All employees are entitled to earn one hour of paid sick leave every 30 hours after working 30 days. Employees can earn up to 48 hours a year, but companies can limit the amount one can use to 40. Unused hours are carried over. Companies are only required to allow employees to use their time off after being employed for 90 days. San Francisco, Oakland, Long Beach, San Diego, Emeryville, Santa Monica, Los Angeles, and Berkeley have more expansive requirements.

=== Colorado ===
All employees earn one hour of paid sick leave for every 30 hours worked and can accrue and use up to 48 a year, with unused hours being carried over. If a public health emergency is declared, full-time workers are allowed an additional 80 hours off, while part-time workers are allowed an additional number of days equal to their average days worked a week or schedules to work in 14 days.

=== Connecticut ===
Companies with 50 or more employees are required to provide paid sick leave to hourly, service workers. Temporary or day workers are not included. Employees earn one hour off for every 40 hours worked and can use up to 40 hours a year, with unused hours carrying over.

=== Delaware ===
Delaware does not require paid sick leave.

=== Florida ===
Florida does not require paid sick leave and preempts local government from requiring it.

=== Georgia ===
Georgia does not require paid sick leave and preempts local government from requiring it.

=== Hawaii ===
Hawaii does not require paid sick leave.

=== Idaho ===
Idaho does not require paid sick leave.

=== Illinois ===
All employees are entitled to one hour of paid leave for every 40 hours worked and can accrue up to 40 hours per year. Leave can be used for any reason. In addition, Cook County and its county seat of Chicago have local paid sick leave laws, although some municipalities have opted out. In those two localities, anyone - except government employees and some construction workers - who works more than 80 hours within 120 days can earn one hour off for every 40 hours worked. The maximum time off is 40 hours a year.

=== Indiana ===
Indiana does not require paid sick leave and preempts local government from requiring it.

=== Iowa ===
Iowa does not require paid sick leave and preempts local government from requiring it.

=== Kansas ===
Kansas does not require paid sick leave and preempts local government from requiring it.

=== Kentucky ===
Kentucky does not require paid sick leave and preempts local government from requiring it.

=== Louisiana ===
Louisiana does not require paid sick leave and preempts local government from requiring it.

=== Maine ===
Companies with 10 or more employees are required to give employees one hour of paid leave for every 40 hours worked. Leave can be used for any purpose, but planned leave required 4 weeks notice. Only 40 hours can be used a year, with unused hours carrying over. Employers are only required to allow workers to take time off after being employed for 120 days.

=== Maryland ===
Companies with 25 or more employees are required to give anyone who works over 12 hours a week paid sick and safe leave. Workers earn 1 hour of paid sick and safe leave every 30 hours and can use up to 40 hours a year. Unused time can be carried over, but employers can limit the number of accrued hours to 64. Local governments are preempted from enacting more expansive requirements as of January 1, 2017. Montgomery County's sick and safe leave law, enacted on October 1, 2016, grants up to 56 hours of paid sick leave to anyone who works more than 8 hours a week and for a company with more than 5 employees.

All employers are required by Maryland law to inform their workers in writing the amount of available earned sick and safe leave. In Montgomery County, this requirement may be satisfied by documenting available leave on pay stubs and/or through an online portal that workers can access.

=== Massachusetts ===
Most employees who work for companies with more than 11 employees are entitled to 40 hours of paid sick leave after being employed for 90 days.

=== Michigan ===
In 2015, Michigan preempted local governments from requiring paid sick leave, but in 2018, they passed a law requiring paid sick leave for companies with 50 or more employees. Workers earn one hour of sick leave for every 35 hours worked. Up to 40 hours can be earned, but it can only be used after being employed 90 days.

=== Minnesota ===
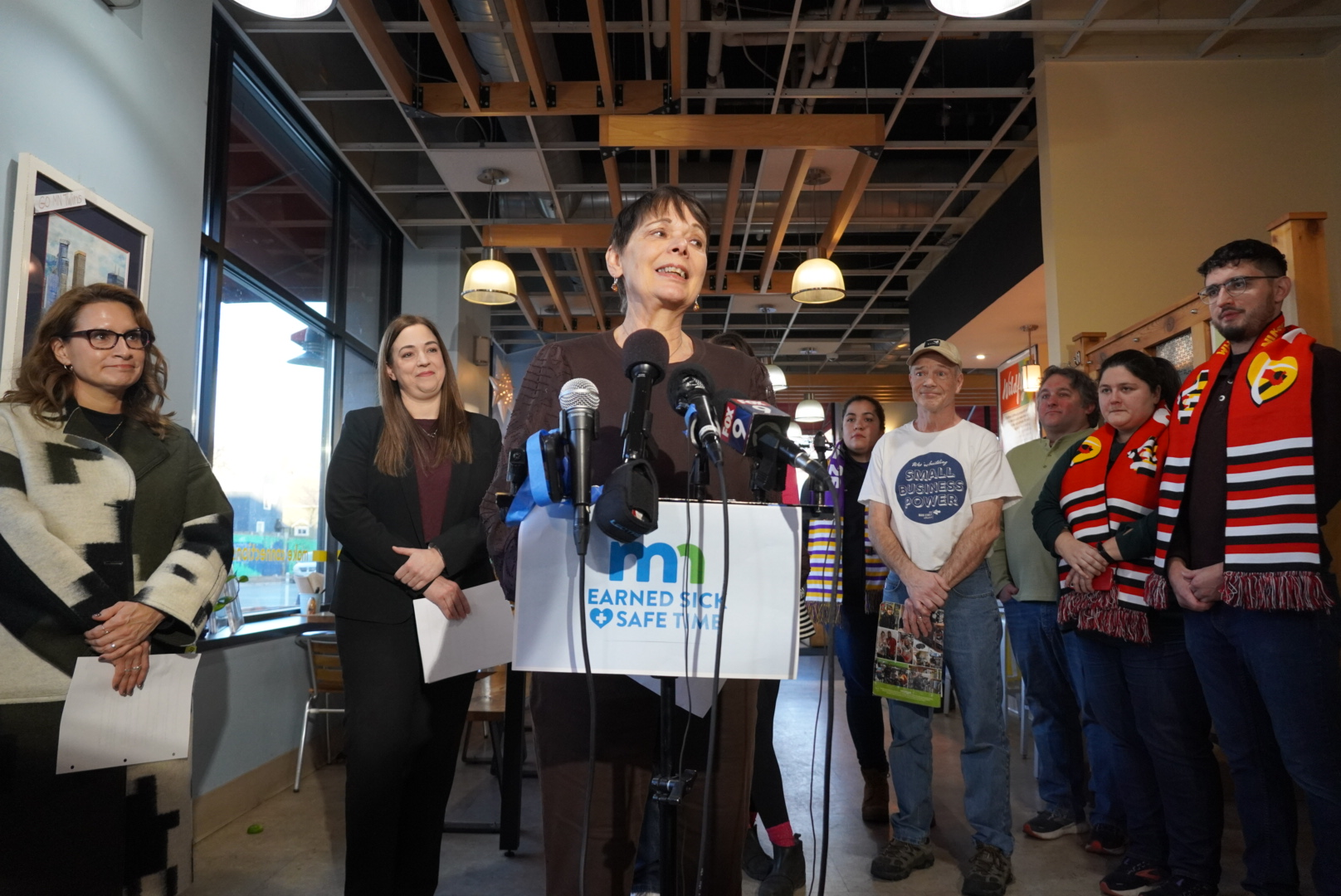
Sandy Pappas speaking at an Earned Sick and Safe Time press conference with Peggy Flanagan.

All employees are entitled to one hour of paid sick leave for every 30 hours worked and can accrue up to 48 hours per year. In Duluth, companies with at least 5 employees are required to give workers up to 40 hours of sick leave per year. In Minneapolis, employees who work more than 80 hours are guaranteed 48 hours of sick leave, if they work for a company with 6 or more employees. In St. Paul, employees who work more than 80 hours are entitled to up 48 hours a year.

=== Mississippi ===
Mississippi does not require paid sick leave and preempts local government from requiring it.

=== Missouri ===
Missouri does not require paid sick leave and preempts local government from requiring it.

=== Montana ===
Montana does not require paid sick leave.

=== Nebraska ===
Nebraska did not require paid sick leave until 2024, when voters approved a law to require businesses to provide paid sick days. This law was put into effect in October 2025.

As of 2026, companies with 11 or more employees are required to give their employees sick leave. Workers earn one hour of paid sick leave for every 30 hours worked. Employers with 20 or more employees are required to allow said employees to accrue up to 56 hours a year, while employers with 11 to 19 employees only have to allow 40 hours a year.

=== Nevada ===
Companies with 50 or more employees are required to give full-time employees sick leave. Temporary or seasonal employees are not included. Workers earn 0.01923 hours of paid leave for every hour worked, which can be used after 90 days of employment. Unused hours carry over.

=== New Hampshire ===
New Hampshire does not require paid sick leave.

=== New Jersey ===
All companies are required to give up to 40 hours of paid sick leave per year for both full- and part-time employees, except per diem healthcare employees and unionized construction workers. Eligible employees earn one hour of paid sick leave for every 30 hours worked and can use it after 120 days after being hired. Unused time can be carried over. Local governments are preempted from creating their own requirements.

=== New Mexico ===
Workers earn one hour of paid sick leave for every 30 hours worked and can use up to 64 hours per year, with unused hours being carried over.

=== New York ===
Companies with 5 or more employees or a net income of more than $1M must provide paid sick leave. Both part- and full-time employees earn one hour off for every 30 hours worked and can use up to 40 hour a year. Employees of companies with more than 100 employees are entitled to 56 hours per year. Government employees are not covered. Unused hours can be carried over. Cities with a population of over one million can create more expansive requirements and both Westchester County and New York City have done so.

=== North Carolina ===
North Carolina does not require paid sick leave and preempts local government from requiring it.

=== North Dakota ===
North Dakota does not require paid sick leave.

=== Ohio ===
Ohio does not require paid sick leave and preempts local government from requiring it.

=== Oklahoma ===
Oklahoma does not require paid sick leave and preempts local government from requiring it.

=== Oregon ===
Companies with 10 or more employees must provide up to 40 hours of paid sick leave per year, which can be used 90 days after being hired. Full-time, part-time, and temporary employees are covered and earn one hour off for every 40 hours worked. Although state law preempts local governments from creating their own requirements, companies with 6 or more employees must provide time off in Portland.

=== Pennsylvania ===
Pennsylvania does not require paid sick leave. In Philadelphia, companies with 10 or more employees must provide up to 40 hours of paid sick leave. Pittsburgh requires companies with 15 or more employees to provide up to 40 hours, while small business employees are entitled to 24 hours per year.

=== Rhode Island ===
Companies with more than 18 employees must provide up to 40 hours of paid sick leave to full-time, part-time, and temporary employees. Workers earn one hour off for every 34 hours worked, which can be used after 90 days for full-time employees, 180 days for part-time employees, and 150 days for seasonal employees.

=== South Carolina ===
South Carolina does not require paid sick leave and preempts local government from requiring it.

=== South Dakota ===
South Dakota does not require paid sick leave.

=== Tennessee ===
Tennessee does not require paid sick leave and preempts local government from requiring it.

=== Texas ===
Texas does not require paid sick leave and preempts local government from requiring it.

=== Utah ===
Utah does not require paid sick leave.

=== Vermont ===
Employees who work over 18 hours per week, on average annually, are entitled to up to 40 hours of paid sick leave. Both full- and part-time employees are covered, but it does not apply to seasonal employees, per diem healthcare workers, federal workers, and some state workers. New businesses are exempt for 12 months after hiring their first employee. Employees earn one hour off for every 52 hours worked, which can be used one year after being hired.

=== Virginia ===
As of 2026, Virginia law mandates paid sick leave only for home health workers. However, in March 2026, Virginia lawmakers passed legislation (HB5/SB199 and SB2) establishing statewide paid sick and family leave, which was signed into law in May 2026. The new law grants employees 1 hour of paid sick leave for every 30 hours worked, capped at 40 hours annually. The law will go into effect for companies with 50 or more employees on July 1, 2027, for companies with 25 or more employees on January 1, 2028, and for all companies on January 1, 2029. A separate, payroll-funded program will offer 12 weeks of paid family/medical leave.

=== Washington ===
Employees earn one hour of paid sick leave for every 40 hours worked. There's no maximum number of hours than can be accrued, but only 40 hours can be carried over into the next year. SeaTac, Seattle, and Tacoma have more expansive requirements.

=== Washington DC ===
Companies with 24 or fewer employees are required to give up to 3 days of sick and safe leave per year, companies with 25 to 99 employees are required to give 5, and companies with 100 or more employees must provide 7. Time can be used after 90 days of employment and unused time can be carried over.

=== West Virginia ===
West Virginia does not require paid sick leave.

=== Wisconsin ===
Wisconsin does not require paid sick leave and preempts local government from requiring it.

=== Wyoming ===
Wyoming does not require paid sick leave.

== Proposed policies in the United States ==
=== Public opinion ===
In August 2008, the National Opinion Research Center at the University of Chicago released their findings from a national public opinion poll on paid sick days.

- 86 percent of people surveyed said they favor a basic paid sick day policy.
- 94 percent of self-identified liberals and 81 percent of self-identified conservatives believed that paid sick day should be a basic workplace right.
- 77 percent of respondents believed that paid sick days were very important.
- 63 percent of workers who do not have access to paid sick leave said they are concerned about not having paid sick days.
- 16 percent of workers report that they or a family member have been fired, suspended, or otherwise punished or that they would be fired if they missed work due to illness.
- 46 percent of respondents said they are more likely to vote for a candidate who supports paid sick days.

=== U.S. federal legislation ===
Since 2004, the Healthy Families Act (HR 2460 / S 1152) has repeatedly been proposed in Congress. It would establish a basic workplace mandate of paid sick days so workers can take paid sick days to care for their health or the health of their families.

The bill creates a minimum requirement that allows workers to earn up to seven days per year of paid leave to recover from illness, to care for a sick family member, or to seek preventative health care. It enables victims of domestic violence, stalking, and sexual assault to take paid time off to recover from incidents and seek assistance from the police or court. It also allows people to take time off to care for ill parents and elderly relatives, or to attend diagnostic or routine medical appointments. Employers with fewer than 15 workers would be exempt from the law.

The Healthy Families Act would allow an additional 30 million workers to have access to paid sick leave from their jobs, including 15 million low-wage workers and 13 million women workers. If the bill were to become law, 90 percent of all American workers would have access to paid sick days (up from 61 percent currently).

A version of the bill was first introduced in 2004. Each session, it has gained support inside and outside of Congress. Congresswoman Rosa DeLauro and Senator Edward Kennedy reintroduced the Healthy Families Act in the 111th Congress in May 2009. After Senator Kennedy's death, Senator Chris Dodd became the lead Senate sponsor of the Healthy Families Act. The bill currently has 125 co-sponsors in the House and 24 in the Senate.

The Healthy Families Act was the subject of three hearings in the 111th United States Congress:

- House Education and Labor Committee's Workforce Protections Subcommittee hearing on the Healthy Families Act on June 11, 2009.
- Senate Committee on Health, Education, Labor and Pensions, Subcommittee on Children and Families hearing, "The Cost of Being Sick: H1N1 and Paid Sick Days," on November 10, 2009.
- House Education and Labor Committee hearing, "Protecting Employees, Employers and the Public: H1N1 and Sick Leave Policies," on November 17, 2009.

The Obama Administration has testified in support of the bill. First Lady Michelle Obama has spoken out on numerous occasions about the need for a paid sick day mandate.

The U.S. government guarantees federal employees 13 paid sick days a year.
