= 1998 United States Senate election in New York =

- November 3, 1998
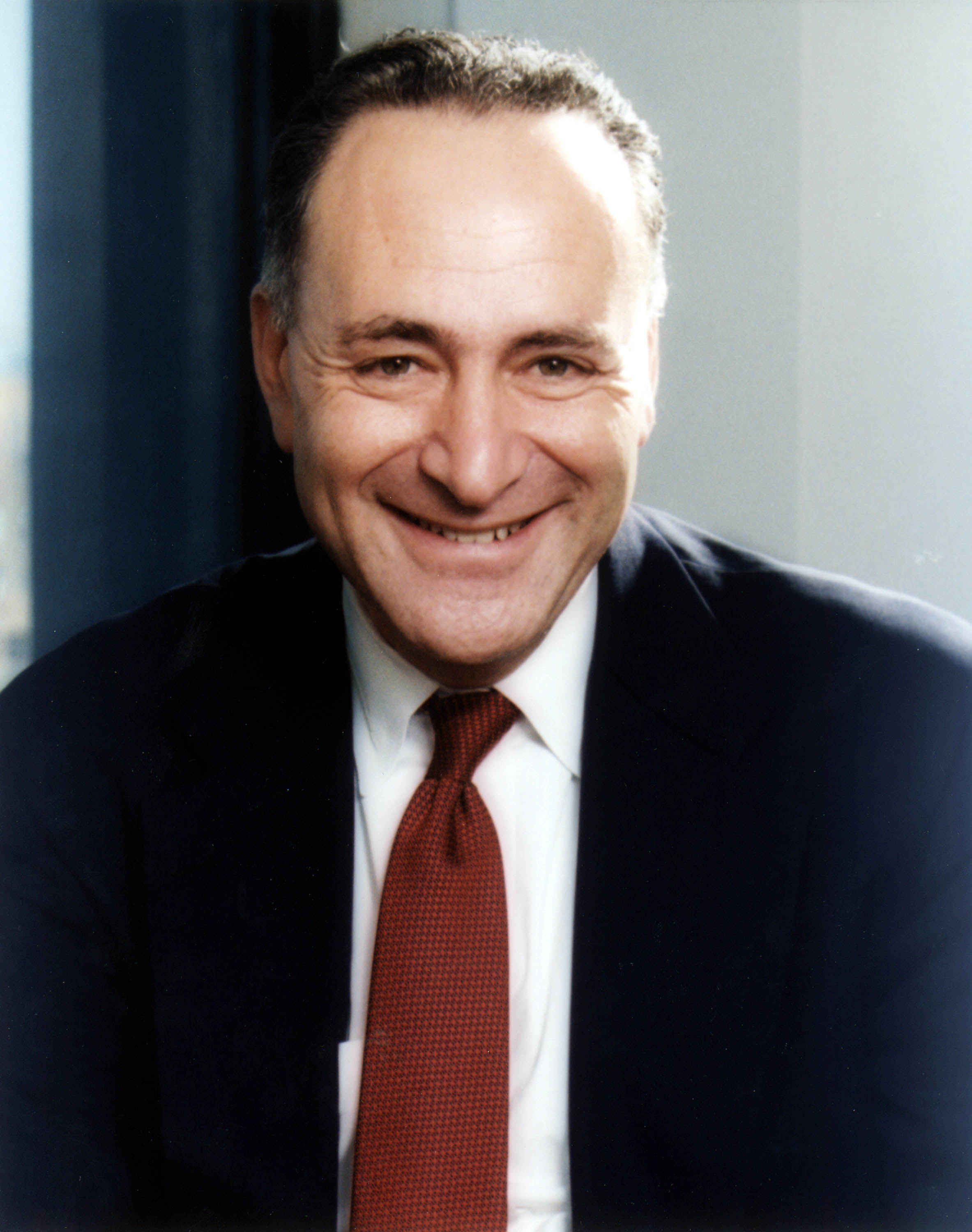

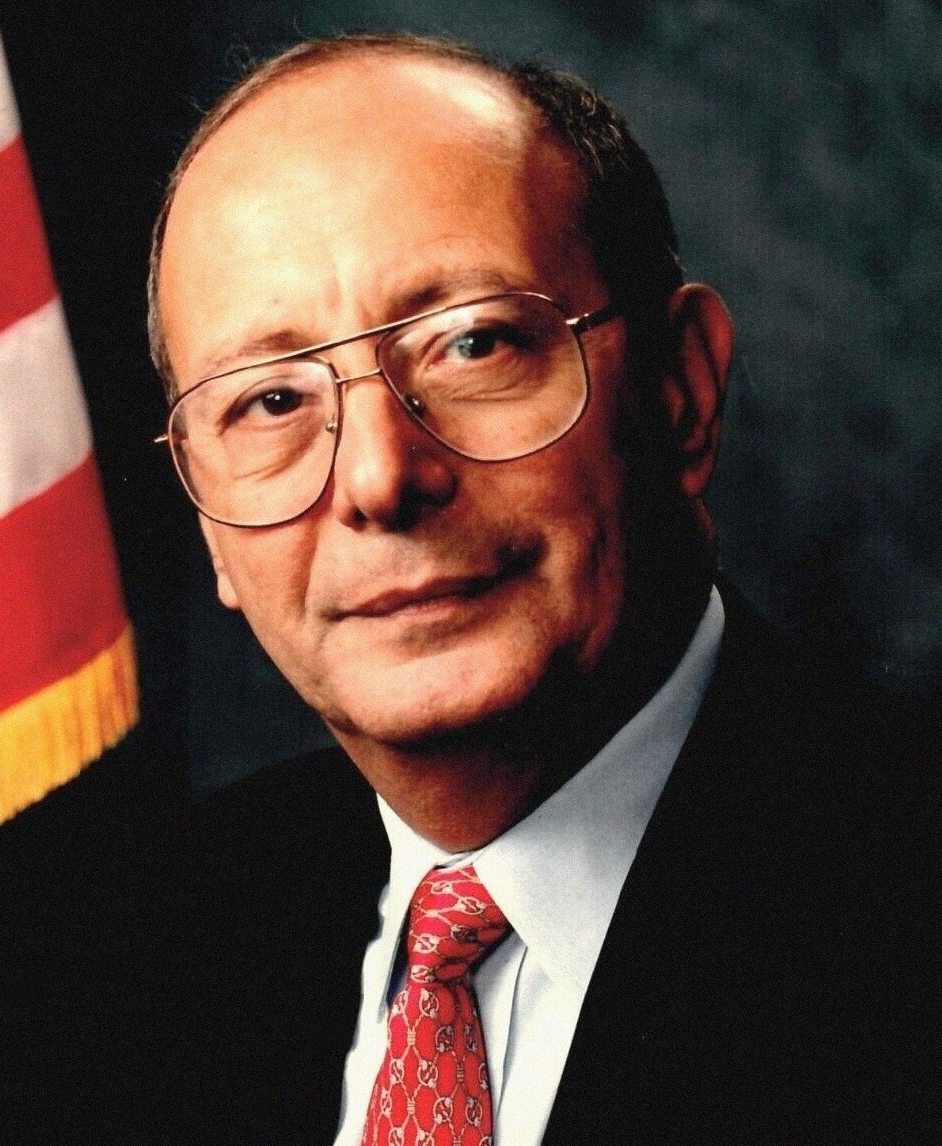
Nominee	Chuck Schumer	Al D'Amato
Party	Democratic	Republican
Alliance	Parties: Independence; Liberal	Parties: Conservative; Right to Life
Popular vote	2,551,065	2,058,988
Percentage	54.62%	44.08%
- County results Schumer: 40–50% 50–60% 60–70% 70–80% 80–90% D'Amato: 50–60% 60–70% 70–80%
U.S. senator before election
Al D'Amato
Republican
Elected U.S. Senator
Chuck Schumer
Democratic

The 1998 United States Senate election in New York was held November 3, 1998. Republican incumbent Al D'Amato ran for a fourth term in office but was defeated by Democratic U.S. representative Chuck Schumer in the "high[est] profile and nastiest" contest of the 1998 United States elections.

Primary elections were held on September 15. Schumer defeated the early favorite for the Democratic nomination, television host and 1984 vice presidential nominee Geraldine Ferraro, who was making her second unsuccessful bid to face D'Amato. The third candidate in the Democratic race was New York City public advocate Mark Green, whom D'Amato had defeated in a 1986 landslide. Schumer was also nominated by the Liberal and Independence parties, while D'Amato was nominated by the Conservative and Right to Life parties.

This was the first time since 1950 that Democrats won the Class 3 United States Senate seat from New York, and the last time an incumbent U.S. Senator from New York lost a general election. Schumer's swearing in marked the first time since 1947 that Democrats held both of New York's U.S. Senate seats.

== Democratic primary ==
=== Candidates ===
- Geraldine Ferraro, host of Crossfire, former U.S. representative from Queens, 1984 nominee for vice president, and 1992 candidate for U.S. Senate
- Mark Green, New York City public advocate and 1986 nominee for U.S. Senate (also running as Independence)
- Eric Ruano-Melendez, perennial candidate
- Chuck Schumer, U.S. representative from Brooklyn (also running as Liberal and Independence)

=== Campaign ===
Ferraro was well known for having been the 1984 Democratic vice presidential nominee, and had also run, but lost, in the Democratic primary in the 1992 U.S. Senate election in New York. Green had been the Democratic nominee in the 1986 election, but lost in the general election to D'Amato.

At the start of 1998, Ferraro had done no fund-raising, out of fear of conflict of interest with her job, hosting the CNN program Crossfire, but was nonetheless perceived as the front-runner by virtue of her name recognition; indeed, December and January polls had her 25 percentage points ahead of Green in the race, and even further ahead of Schumer. Unlike her previous campaigns, Ferraro's family finances never became an issue in 1998. However, she lost ground during the summer, with Schumer catching her in the polls by early August, and then soon passing her. Schumer, a tireless fund-raiser, outspent her by a five-to-one margin, and Ferraro failed to establish a political image current with the times. In the September 15, 1998, primary, she was beaten soundly by Schumer, with a 51 percent to 26 percent margin. Unlike the bitter 1992 Democratic senatorial primary, this contest was not divisive, and Ferraro and third-place finisher Green endorsed Schumer at a unity breakfast the following day.

=== Polling ===
Source	Date	Mark Green	Geraldine Ferraro	Chuck Schumer
Quinnipiac	September 25, 1997	25%	48%	15%
Quinnipiac	December 11, 1997	25%	48%	12%
Quinnipiac	February 26, 1998	19%	46%	18%
Quinnipiac	March 26, 1998	20%	50%	15%
Quinnipiac	June 18, 1998	23%	46%	19%
Quinnipiac	July 16, 1998	24%	39%	28%

=== Results ===
Democratic primary results by county Schumer: Schumer—40–50%; Schumer—50–60%; Schumer—60–70%; Ferraro: Ferraro—40–50%; Ferraro—50–60%; Ferraro—60–70%; Ferraro—70–80%

The primaries were held on September 15, 1998.

1998 U.S. Senate Democratic primary
Party	Candidate	Votes	%
Democratic	Chuck Schumer	388,701	50.84%
Democratic	Geraldine Ferraro	201,625	26.37%
Democratic	Mark Green	145,819	19.07%
Democratic	Eric Ruano-Melendez	28,493	3.73%

== Republican primary ==
=== Candidates ===
- Al D'Amato, incumbent U.S. senator since 1981

==== Declined ====
- Betsy McCaughey Ross, incumbent lieutenant governor of New York (ran for governor as Democratic and Liberal)

=== Polling ===
Source	Date	Alfonse D'Amato	Betsy McCaughey Ross
Quinnipiac	September 25, 1997	55%	26%

== Other primaries ==
=== Independence ===
1998 Independence Party U.S. Senate primary
Party	Candidate	Votes	%	±%
Independence	Chuck Schumer	2,562	58.04%	
Independence	Mark Green	1,852	41.96%	

=== Right to Life ===
1998 Right to Life U.S. Senate primary
Party	Candidate	Votes	%	±%
Right to Life	Al D'Amato (incumbent)	3,798	63.07%	
Right to Life	Thomas Drolesky	2,224	36.93%	

== General election ==
=== Candidates ===
- Rose Ana Berbeo (Socialist Workers Party)
- Al D'Amato, incumbent U.S. senator since 1981 (Republican, Conservative, and Right to Life)
- Joel Kovel, psychiatrist and eco-socialist activist (Green Party)
- Corinne Kurtz (Marijuana Reform Party)
- William McMillen (Libertarian Party)
- Chuck Schumer, U.S. representative from Brooklyn (Democratic, Liberal, and Independence)

=== Campaign ===
During the campaign, D'Amato attempted to brand Schumer as a die-hard liberal, while Schumer accused D'Amato of being a liar. When D'Amato's first strategy failed, D'Amato attacked his opponent's attendance record as a member of Congress, which Schumer refuted.

Late in the campaign, D'Amato called Schumer a "putzhead" in a private meeting with Jewish supporters ("putz" is Yiddish for penis, and can be slang for "fool"). He later apologized for the comment.

In the last days of the campaign, D'Amato campaigned with popular New York governor George Pataki, who was also running for reelection, and was also supported by New York City mayor Rudy Giuliani and former Democratic mayor Ed Koch.

Vice President Al Gore and First Lady Hillary Clinton personally campaigned for Schumer, as D'Amato was a prominent critic of President Bill Clinton who led the investigation into Whitewater. Though the Republican Party was well organized, the Democratic Party benefited from robocalls from President Clinton and mobilization from two major unions, the United Federation of Teachers and 1199SEIU.

Though D'Amato was effective in obtaining federal government funds for New York state projects during his Senate career, he failed to capitalize on this in the election. Also, Schumer was a tenacious fundraiser, and was aggressive in his attacks. The candidates spent $30 million during the race.

=== Polling ===
Poll source	Date(s)	Sample size	Margin of error	Al D'Amato (R)	Chuck Schumer (D)	Other / undecided (Note: Calculated by taking the difference of 100% and all other candidates combined.)
Zogby Interactive/JZ Analytics	October 31, 1998	1,196	—	47.3%	46.5%	6.2%
Harris Insights & Analytics	October 30, 1998	2,243	—	46%	50%	4%
Quinnipiac University	October 29, 1998	584	—	42%	50%	8%
Zogby Interactive/JZ Analytics	October 29, 1998	700	—	37%	41%	22%
Blum & Weprin Associates	October 28, 1998	662	—	42%	46%	12%
Marist College	October 27, 1998	351	—	47%	50%	3%
Mason-Dixon Polling & Strategy	October 27, 1998	808	—	43%	46%	11%
Zogby Interactive/JZ Analytics	October 27, 1998	700	—	38%	44%	18%
Manhattanville College	October 25, 1998	601 (RV)	—	42%	50%	8%
Zogby Interactive/JZ Analytics	October 25, 1998	700	—	39%	43%	18%
CBS News/The New York Times	October 23, 1998	1,235 (RV)	—	44%	44%	12%
Quinnipiac University	October 23, 1998	600 (Note: Sample size unavailable; 600 is a default estimate used in the source dataset.)	—	44%	48%	8%
Zogby Interactive/JZ Analytics	October 23, 1998	700	—	42%	40%	18%
SurveyUSA	October 21, 1998	500	—	43%	48%	9%
Zogby Interactive/JZ Analytics	October 21, 1998	702 (Note: Average of multiple versions or turnout models listed in the poll; the source dataset gives the sample size as 701.5.)	—	43%	39%	18%
Harris Insights & Analytics	October 20, 1998	1,792	—	46%	44%	10%
Zogby Interactive/JZ Analytics	October 15, 1998	706	—	42%	37%	21%
Quinnipiac University	October 14, 1998	—	—	45%	46%	9%
Blum & Weprin Associates	October 13, 1998	364	—	52%	44%	4%
Garin-Hart-Yang Research Group (D) (Note: Poll conducted for an unspecified Democratic sponsor.)	October 13, 1998	902	—	42%	46%	12%
Quinnipiac University	September 24, 1998	—	—	43%	47%	10%
Quinnipiac University	June 18, 1998	—	—	49%	37%	14%
Quinnipiac University	March 26, 1998	—	—	45%	41%	14%
Quinnipiac University	February 26, 1998	—	—	45%	41%	14%
Quinnipiac University	December 11, 1997	—	—	45%	40%	15%
Quinnipiac University	September 25, 1997	—	—	40%	43%	17%

Hypothetical polling

with Ferraro

Source	Date	Al D'Amato (R)	Geraldine Ferraro (D)
Quinnipiac	July 23, 1997	32%	55%
Quinnipiac	September 25, 1997	36%	54%
Quinnipiac	December 11, 1997	38%	52%
Quinnipiac	February 26, 1998	38%	50%
Quinnipiac	March 26, 1998	37%	53%

with Ferraro and Schumer

Source	Date	Al D'Amato (R)	Geraldine Ferraro (D)	Chuck Schumer (L)
Quinnipiac	June 18, 1998	41%	38%	12%

with Green

Source	Date	Al D'Amato (R)	Mark Green (D)
Quinnipiac	September 25, 1997	39%	47%
Quinnipiac	December 11, 1997	41%	46%
Quinnipiac	February 26, 1998	43%	43%
Quinnipiac	March 26, 1998	44%	44%

with Green and Schumer

Source	Date	Al D'Amato (R)	Mark Green (D)	Chuck Schumer (L)
Quinnipiac	June 18, 1998	44%	28%	14%

=== Results ===
The race was ultimately not close, with Schumer defeating the incumbent D'Amato by just over 10%. D'Amato did win a majority of New York's counties, but his wins were in less populated areas. Schumer's win is attributed to strong performance in New York City. Schumer also performed well in heavily populated upstate cities, like Buffalo, Syracuse, Rochester, and Albany. Schumer was sworn in on January 3, 1999.

1998 United States Senate election in New York
Party	Candidate	Votes	%	±%
Democratic	Chuck Schumer	2,386,314	51.09%	+5.52%
Independence	Chuck Schumer	109,027	2.33%	
Liberal	Chuck Schumer	55,724	1.19%	−1.03%
Total	Chuck Schumer	2,551,065	54.62%	+6.84%
Republican	Al D'Amato	1,680,203	35.97%	−5.10%
Conservative	Al D'Amato	274,220	5.87%	+1.39%
Right to Life	Al D'Amato	104,565	2.24%	−1.24%
Total	Al D'Amato (incumbent)	2,058,988	44.08%	−4.95%
Marijuana Reform	Corinne Kurtz	34,281	0.73%	
Green	Joel Kovel	14,735	0.32%	
Libertarian	William McMillen	8,223	0.18%	−1.50%
Socialist Workers	Rose Ana Berbeo	3,513	0.08%	−0.18%
Total votes		4,670,805	100.00%	
Democratic gain from Republican				

== See also ==
- 1998 United States Senate elections
