= Electoral fusion in the United States =

Electoral list strategy

An example of an election ballot featuring electoral fusion from the 2022 United States elections in Jefferson County, NY

Electoral fusion in the United States is an arrangement where two or more United States political parties on a ballot list the same candidate, allowing that candidate to receive votes on multiple party lines in the same election.

Electoral fusion is also known as fusion voting, cross endorsement, multiple party nomination, multi-party nomination, plural nomination and ballot freedom.

Electoral fusion was once widespread in the U.S. and legal in every state. However, as of 2024, it remains legal and common only in New York and Connecticut.

== Overview ==
In 2016, Business Insider wrote: "Fusion voting gives voters a chance to support a major candidate while registering their unhappiness with that candidate's party. A cross-endorsement from a smaller party like the Working Families Party can also help inform voters about where candidates stand on certain issues".

In 2019, The Nation wrote: "Fusion is a response to the winner-take-all electoral system. It solves the 'wasted vote' or 'spoiler' dilemmas that otherwise plague third parties, and allows citizens who don't fit neatly into the Democratic or Republican boxes to nevertheless participate constructively in politics".

Before the Civil War, fusion voting was a common electoral tactic of abolitionist forces, who formed a number of anti-slavery third parties, including the Liberty and Free Soil parties. These and other abolitionist third parties cross-nominated major party candidates running under the Whig label, fusing more than one party behind a single candidate.

After the Civil War, agrarian interest groups and the political parties they founded continued to use fusion voting to form alliances between third parties and the weaker of the two major parties, usually the Democrats in the West and Midwest. In the 19th and early 20th century, minor parties used fusion as a way to signal that their support for a major party candidate brought a meaningful number of voters to the candidate. Votes for fusion candidates were tallied first by party, then added together to produce the outcome. Historian Peter Argersinger argues that this helped "maintain a significant third party tradition by guaranteeing that dissenters' votes could be more than symbolic protest". Fusion allowed minor parties to avoid the "wasted vote" and "spoiler" dilemmas that small parties face in a non-proportional voting system.

The People's Party (also known as the Populists) is regarded as the most successful third party of the era. That success produced a counter-reaction from the dominant major parties, who then used state legislatures to enact bans against fusion in the late nineteenth and early 20th century. In northern and western states, fusion was largely banned by Republican-led legislatures. One Republican Minnesota state legislator said: "We don't propose to allow the Democrats to make allies of the Populists, Prohibitionists, or any other party, and get up combination tickets against us. We can whip them single-handed, but don't intend to fight all creation." In southern states, fusion was largely banned by Democrats who supported Jim Crow, in an attempt to prevent political alliances between newly-enfranchised Black voters and poor white farmers.

Most states banned fusion by the early 20th century. South Dakota banned the practice in 1999, Delaware banned it in 2011, and South Carolina banned it in 2022. In Timmons v. Twin Cities Area New Party (1997), the US Supreme Court ruled that prohibiting electoral fusion does not violate the First Amendment of the Constitution.

Electoral fusion was once widespread in the US, but as of 2024, it remains legal and common only in New York and Connecticut. It is partially legal in three other states: California allows fusion in presidential elections only, and Pennsylvania and Maryland permit it in certain elections, including but not limited to the judiciary. In Oregon and Vermont, a system of dual-labeling exists, which allows a candidate to list multiple party endorsements on a single line, but disallows the traditional fusion system in which a minor party has its own ballot line and votes are tallied by party. In New Hampshire, fusion is legal in rare cases when primary elections are won by write-in candidates.

As of 2024, the Alianza de País in Puerto Rico, the New Jersey Moderate Party, the Common Sense Party in Michigan and the United Kansas Party are attempting to use litigation to bring back fusion voting in their areas.

New Mexico, Massachusetts, and Rhode Island had bills to allow fusion voting.

== Historical examples ==
=== Presidential elections ===
In 1872, both the newly formed Liberal Republican Party and the Democratic Party nominated the Liberal Republican Horace Greeley as their candidate for US President: "If [the Democratic Party] was to stand any chance at all against Grant, it must avoid putting up a candidate of its own who would merely split the opposition vote. It must take Greeley."

In the presidential election of 1896, William Jennings Bryan was nominated by both the Democratic Party and the Populist Party, albeit with different vice presidential candidates, Arthur Sewall for the Democrats and Thomas E. Watson for the Populists. This election led to the downfall of the Populist Party, especially in Southern states (such as Watson's Georgia, as well as North Carolina and Tennessee) where the Populist party had engaged in electoral fusion or other alliances with Republicans against the dominant Bourbon Democrats.

In the 1936 and 1940, the American Labor Party nominated Franklin Roosevelt for president, and in 1944, the Liberal Party of New York cross-nominated Roosevelt, fusing with the ALP. Roosevelt won the state of New York in each election, but in 1940 and 1944 he would not have won New York without the support of votes gained via the fusion parties and their voters.

Donald Trump appeared on the 2016 presidential ballot in California with two ballot labels by his name, as the nominee of both the Republican Party and the American Independent Party, a small far-right party. Trump was the first fusion presidential candidate on the California ballot in at least eighty years.

=== Connecticut ===
Connecticut allows cross-endorsements, listing candidates on more than one ballot line. Minor parties include the Working Families Party and Independent Party. In 2010, Dannel Malloy won the gubernatorial election within the Working Families' margin.

=== New York ===
In 1936, labor leaders in New York City took advantage of fusion and founded the American Labor Party (ALP). Their immediate goal was to provide a way for New Yorkers who despised the Tammany Hall political machine to support Franklin Roosevelt without voting for the Democratic Party. In its first showing at the polls, the party garnered a significant amount of the vote in New York City but was not important with regard to Roosevelt's victory. In the 1937 election cycle, the ALP built on its past performance by electing members to the city council, and by delivering so many votes to Mayor Fiorello La Guardia that the New York Times ran a front page article declaring that the ALP held the balance of power in city and state politics. The importance of the ALP was demonstrated again in 1938 when the party provided the margin of victory for the Democratic candidate for Governor, and in 1940 when the ALP did the same for President Roosevelt. In the 1944 presidential election, fusion provided CIO unions in New York an opportunity to build and back a labor party, an uncommon occurrence in the US. Labor leaders knew that fusion permitted them to field candidates and win elections on the American Labor Party line in local elections, and to back Democrats in statewide or national races where they did not have the capacity to field successful candidates. Given the presence of fusion in New York, the Greater New York Industrial Union Council (GNYIUC), the CIO's local labor federation in New York, formally affiliated with the party making it the political arm of the New York CIO. This relationship would continue until 1948 when the GNYIUC opted to back Henry Wallace for president, instead of using fusion to back President Truman. This led to internal conflicts within the CIO and ultimately contributed to the decision by the national CIO to revoke the charter of the GNYIUC, thereby ending its relationship with the ALP.

As of 2023, to obtain or maintain automatic ballot access, a party's candidate for Governor in midterm election years or President in presidential years must receive either 130,000 votes or 2% of votes cast (whichever is greater) on that party's line.

Other parties, such as the Libertarian Party of New York and the Green Party of New York, have sought ballot access by first getting a gubernatorial candidate on the ballot via petition (by collecting 45,000 valid signatures of registered voters), and then by getting 130,000 votes for that candidate on their line. As a general rule, neither party uses electoral fusion, and both rely on their own candidates. The Green Party, which had first achieved ballot status in 1998, failed to gain 50,000 votes (then the requirement) and also lost its ballot status in 2002, but regained its line when the 2010 election results were certified. In 2018, Larry Sharpe, the Libertarian Party candidate for governor in New York, received over 90,000 votes, giving the party ballot status for the first time in its history.

In July 2019, the New York Legislature passed a budget bill that included the creation of a Public Campaign Financing Commission, which was given authority to investigate and create rules for public financing of campaigns. The Conservative Party of New York and the Working Families Party each filed lawsuits against the state in response, alleging that the commission was a disguised attempt to end fusion voting and thus the existence of New York's third parties.

The 2021 New York City Democratic mayoral primary was the city's first mayoral primary to implement ranked-choice voting, allowing voters to rank up to five candidates. In the 2025 Democratic mayoral primary, Brad Lander and eventual nominee Zohran Mandani cross-endorsed each other for second place. Mamdani would also cross-endorse with Michael Blake a few days later. In the general election, Mamdani would appear on the ballot both as the Democratic candidate and the candidate for the Working Families Party. Due to the votes from Working Families, Mamdani reached a majority in the general election.

=== Oregon ===
Prior to 1958, Oregon practiced a form of fusion that required the state to list multiple nominating parties on the candidate's ballot line. Sylvester Pennoyer was elected governor in 1886 and 1890 as a candidate of the Democratic and People's parties. In 1906, seven members of the Oregon House were also elected as candidates of the People's Party and either the Democratic or Republican parties. In 2008, a lawsuit was brought by the Independent Party of Oregon against the Oregon Secretary of State claiming that modifications to the ballot design statute in 1995 once again required the state to list multiple nominating parties on the candidate's ballot line. The lawsuit gave rise to legislation to allow candidates to list up to three party labels after their name. This bill passed both houses of the Oregon legislature during the 2009 legislative session. Governor Ted Kulongoski signed the bill into law on 23 July 2009.

=== Pennsylvania ===
In Pennsylvania, fusion can occur when members of a party write in the name of a member of a different party in a primary election and secure enough write-in votes to nominate that party's candidate. For example, if Bob Jones is running for school board in a primary election as a Democrat and secures both enough votes from members of his own party as well as enough write-in votes from members of the Republican Party, then electoral fusion occurs, and Bob will appear on the ballot as both a Republican and a Democrat. Similarly, a member of one party may lose their own party's nomination in a primary election but gain enough write-in votes from members of the opposing party to win that party's nomination. For example, in May 2023, Stephen Zappala lost the Democratic primary for Allegheny County District Attorney to challenger Matt Dugan. However, although Zappala is a Democrat, he received the requisite number (500 or more) of write-in votes from Republicans to appear as a Republican on the ballot in November 2023. Running on the ballot as a Republican, Zappala won the general election in November 2023, beating Dugan.

=== Vermont ===
In Vermont, candidates can only run in one party primary, but can run write-in campaigns in others. Political science professor Jack Gierzynski said "When parties work together in a fusion sense, they're much more likely to be successful. ... [Progressives] running on a fusion ticket has had a big influence on moving the public policy needle to the left."

Fusion voting had been at risk due to a sore loser provision of ranked-choice voting legislation.

=== Wisconsin ===
In Milwaukee, Wisconsin, during the heyday of the sewer socialists, the Republican and Democratic parties would agree not to run candidates against each other in some districts, concentrating instead on defeating the socialists. These candidates were usually called non-partisan, but sometimes were termed fusion candidates instead.

== See also ==
- Apparentment – Party-list addition system in elections
- Approval voting – Single-winner electoral system
- Coalition government – Governmental style in which political parties cooperate to form a government
- Cross-filing – Election filing in multiple parties
- Democratic backsliding in the United States
- First-past-the-post voting – Plurality voting system
- Fusionism in North Carolina – Electoral fusion of the Republican and Populist Parties, 1894 to 1900
- Ranked-choice voting in the United States – Electoral system used in some cities and states
- Spoiler effect – Election result affecting losing candidate
- Strategic voting – Choosing a candidate other than preferred to undercut a less desired one
