= Jean-Baptiste André Gautier-Dagoty =

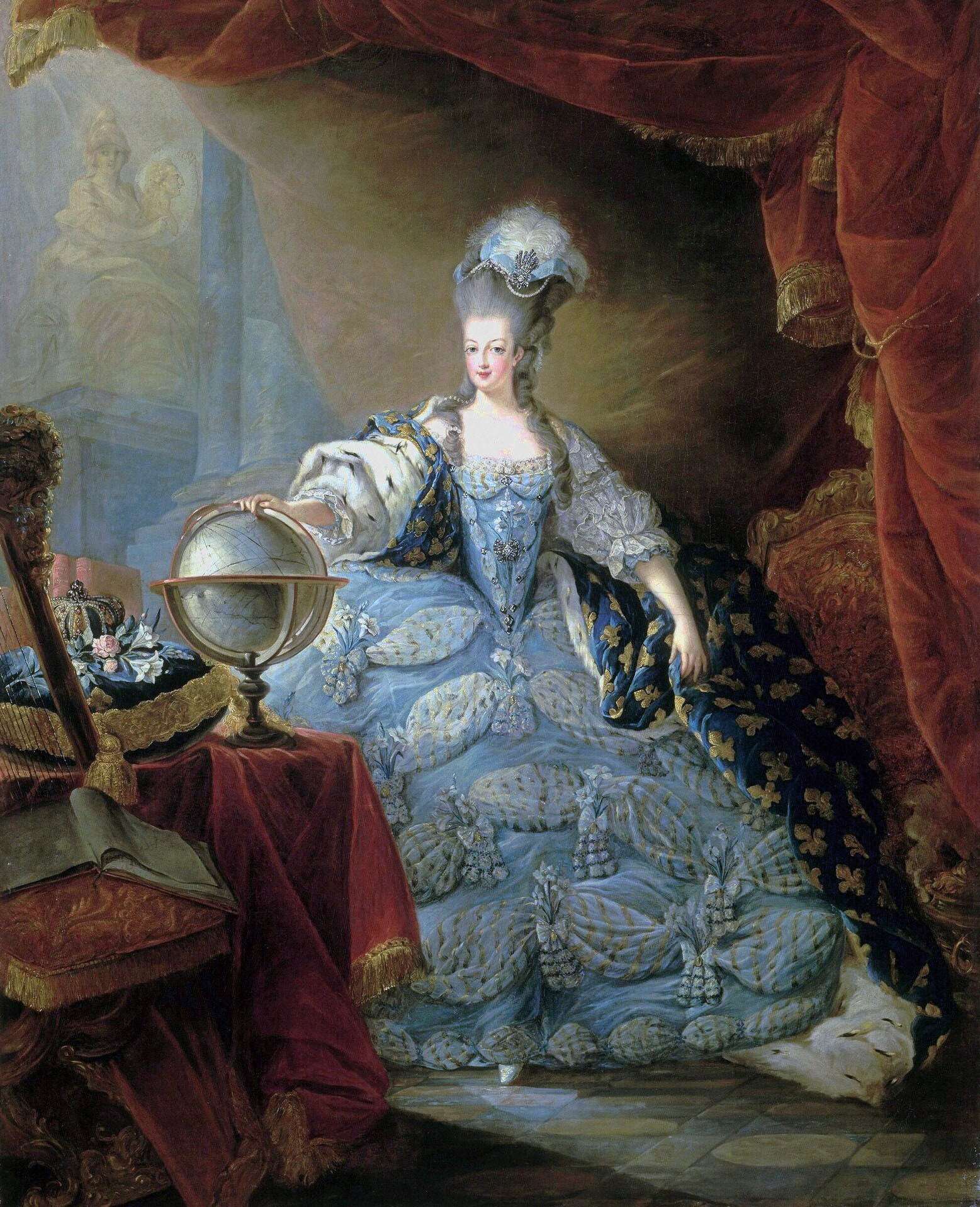
Portrait of Marie Antoinette (1775)

Jean-Baptiste André Gautier-Dagoty, or simply Gautier d'Agoty (15 September 1740, in Paris – 1786, in Paris) was a French painter who specialized in portraits.

== Life and work ==
He was born to Jacques Gautier d'Agoty, a well-known engraver. Four of his brothers became artists: Honoré-Louis, Jean-Fabien, Édouard and Arnauld-Éloi. As a Knight in the Ordre de Saint-Jean-de-Latran, he was often referred to as "Le Chevalier Dagoty".

Never popular within the court, his career appeared to receive a boost when Queen Marie Antoinette commissioned a portrait as a gift for her mother, the Empress Maria Theresa. But, when it was presented in the Hall of Mirrors at Versailles, it was harshly mocked because it was too artificial, at a time when a more natural look was in style. Two years later, the Queen offered it to Georg Adam, Prince of Starhemberg. It was with his family until it was acquired by the philanthropist, Paul-Louis Weiller. He donated it to the Musée de l'Histoire de France in 1954 as part of a major restoration. Many of Dagoty's works, including portraits of the Queen's sisters-in-law, are now in that museum.

Two of his portrait series, with mezzotints created by his father, were begun in the 1770s, but never completed: Gallery of famous men and women who have appeared in France and The French Monarchy.
