= Shirley Jones (artist) =

Welsh writer, poet and printmaker

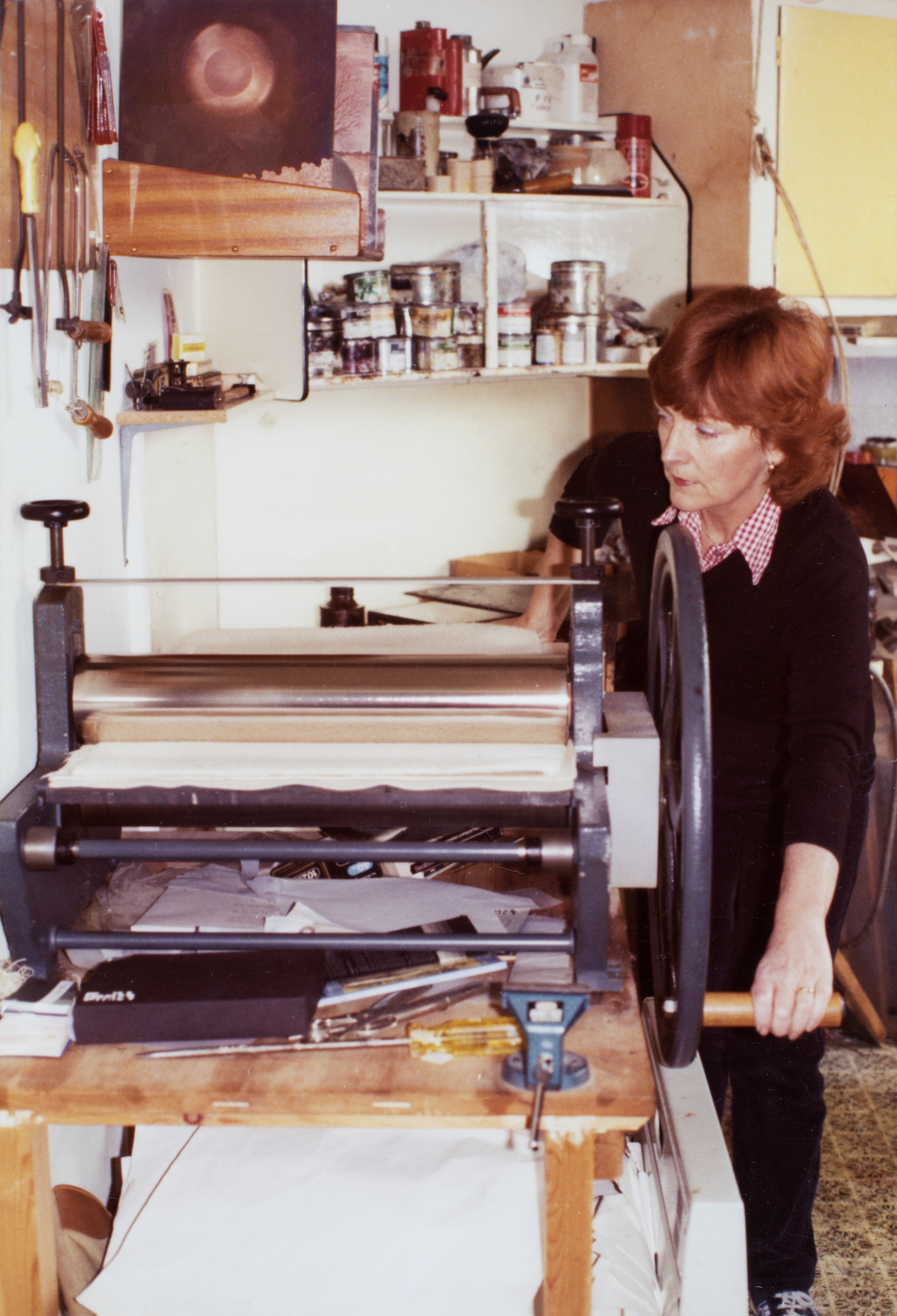
- Jones, c. 1978
- Born: 14 November 1934 (age 91); Rhondda Valley, Wales
- Education: Cardiff University; Croydon College
- Occupations: Printmaker, writer, artist
- Years active: 1975–2019

Shirley Jones (born 14 November 1934) is a Welsh writer, poet and printmaker whose works include limited-edition artist's books published from 1983 to 2016. As a printmaker, she is known particularly for her mezzotints.

Jones's work has been widely exhibited, including solo retrospective exhibitions at the Victoria and Albert Museum, National Library of Wales and Newport Museum. Many of her artist's books were published under her imprint The Red Hen Press (not to be confused with the Californian publisher Red Hen Press).

== Early life and education ==
Jones was born on 14 November 1934 in Rhondda Valley, Wales. Her father was an unemployed coal miner, who later became a railway signalman. She studied literature at Cardiff University, where she met and later married Ken Jones. They had three children, who feature in a number of her books. After graduating from Cardiff, Jones taught English for seven years, while also taking various art classes. She finally left teaching in 1974, aged forty, to study art full time. She took courses in sculpture and printmaking at Croydon College of Art and Design, leading on to a course in advanced printmaking in 1975–1976.

== Exhibitions ==
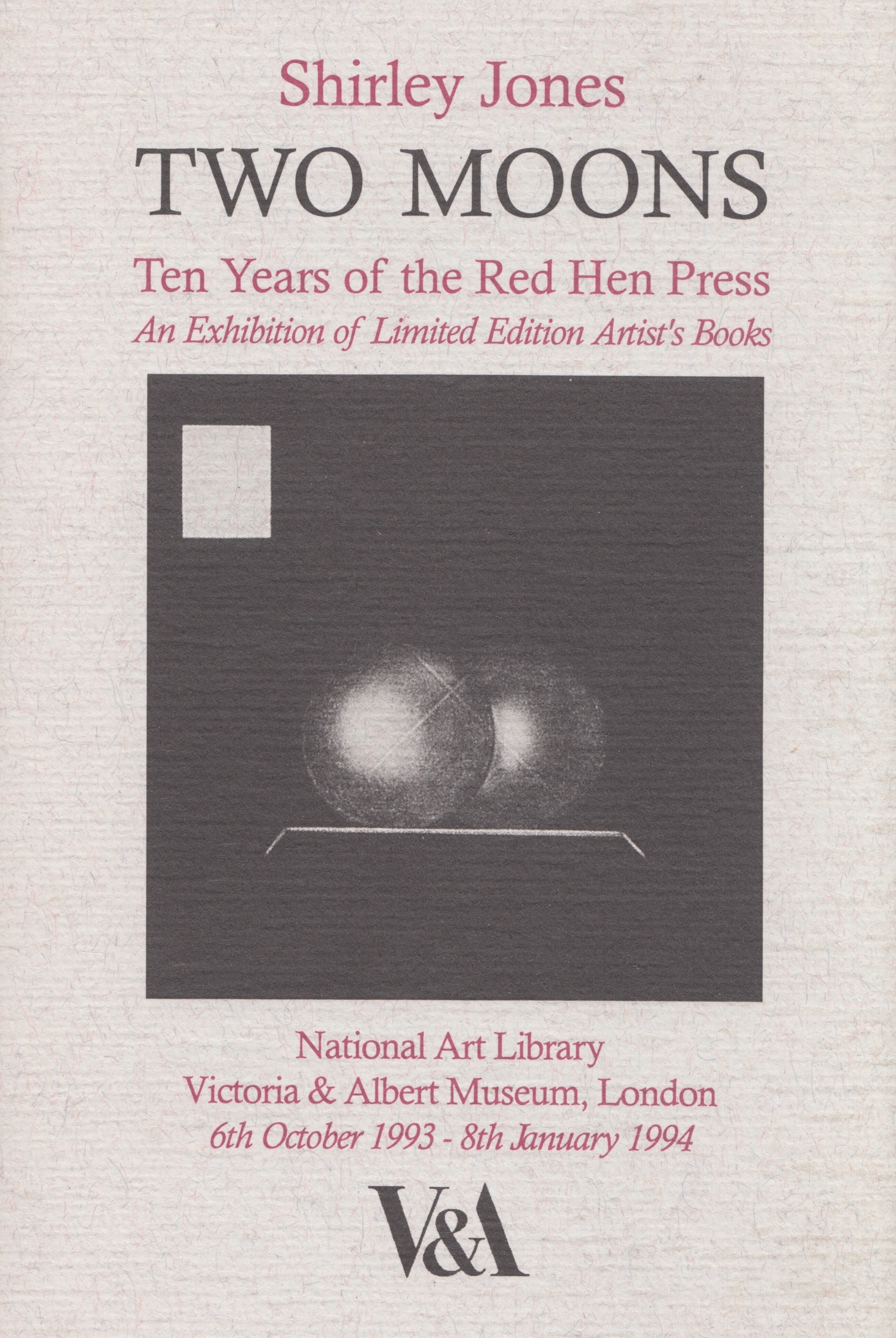
V&A Catalogue (1993)

Jones' work has been the subject of over twenty-five solo exhibitions since 1983. Major retrospective exhibitions include:

- 'Two Moons: Ten Years of the Red Hen Press', National Art Library, Victoria and Albert Museum, London (6 Oct. 1993 – 8 January 1994)
- 'Shirley Jones: Artist, Writer, Printer. Retrospective Exhibition' National Library of Wales, Aberystwyth (1995)
- 'The Written Word. The Printed Image: 25 years of The Red Hen Press'. An exhibition of the artists' books and prints by Shirley Jones' Newport Museum and Art Gallery, Newport (2003)
- 'The Artist's Book in Wales: Shirley Jones and the Red Hen Press' Vassar College Library, Poughkeepsie, New York (January–May, 2013)
- 'Shirley Jones and the Red Hen Press' National Museum of Wales (20 April – 30 June 2013)

Jones' work has also featured in many thematic exhibitions, such as Cardiff University's 'Neighbourly Devils' (31 October 2017 - 31 March 2018).

== Collections ==
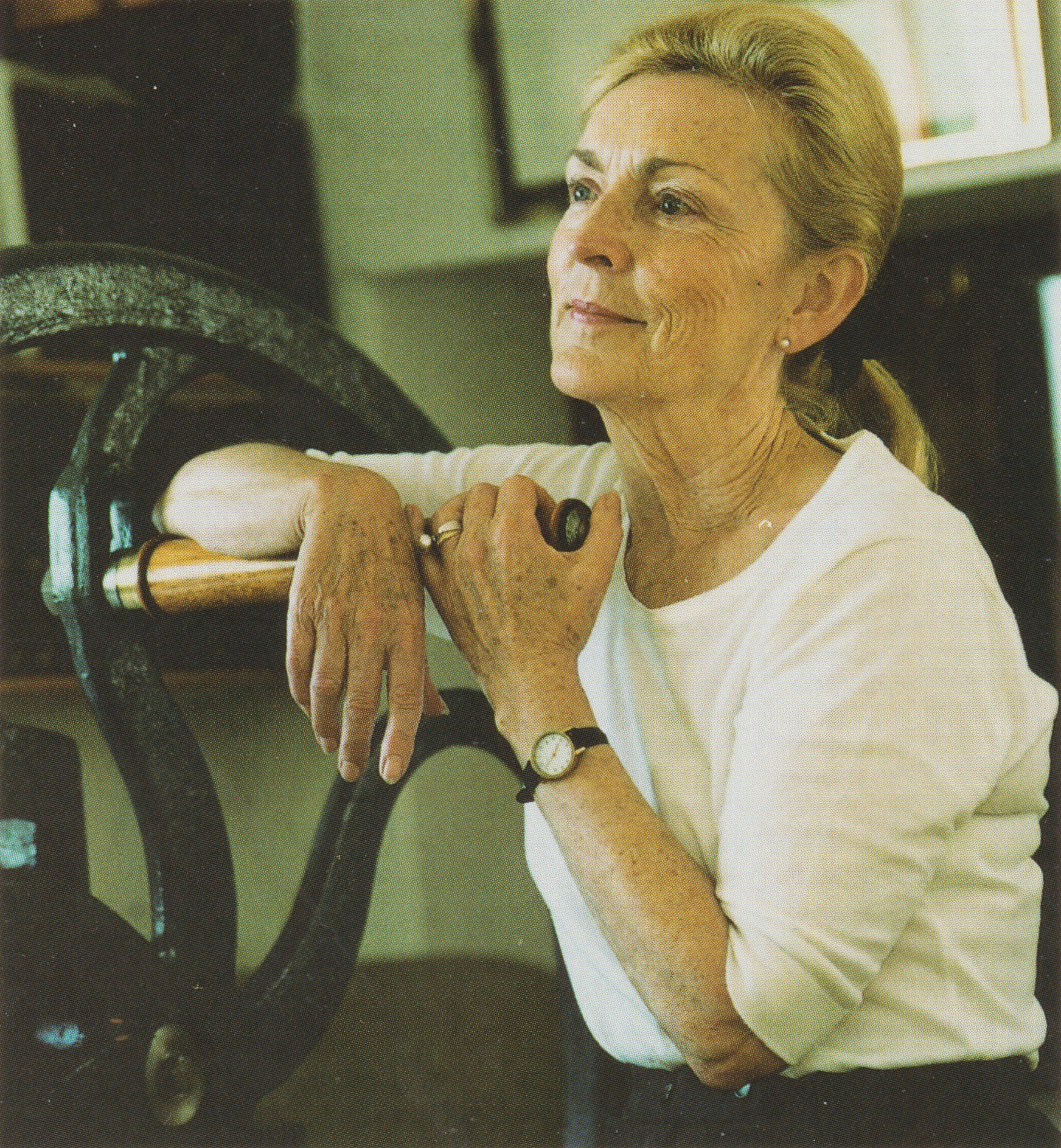
Jones in her studio, 2003

Shirley Jones' work has been collected by over a hundred institutions, particularly in the United States. Notable public collections of Jones's work include those held by the National Museum of Wales, The British Library, The Library of Congress, Cornell University Vassar College, Smith College, and Wellesley College.

Cardiff University acquired a complete collection of her books by donation in 2019. It has digitised and electronically published these, in line with Jones's wish that her images be made available on a Creative Commons Licence (CC-BY). High resolution versions of some of her prints have also been make available on Wikimedia, including those in the Gallery, below. On 7 March 2024 Cardiff issued a press release and video about the donation to mark World Book Day and International Women's Day.

== Publications ==
Jones's publications are listed below. Most are artist's books published by The Red Hen Press during the period of 1975–2016, with print-runs of between six and fifty copies. All of her books (see first footnote) have now been digitized and are available as jpg and tiff files as part of the Cardiff University, Digital Special Collections: "The Red Hen Press: hand-printed, hand-bound artists' books from Shirley Jones' The Red Hen Press". Twenty four of the books (see second footnote) are also available as e-books on the Internet Archive, which allows them to be read in manner closer to their original format. The 'Contents' section in the table is based on the descriptions in Ronald Patkus' bibliography and Jones' reflections on her books. The translations from Old English and Middle Welsh are by Jones.

Year	Title	Contents
1975	Words and Prints	Twelve prints and poems
1977	Windows	Five poems and prints with personal themes
1978	The Same Sun	Social, political and personal poems with nine colour etchings
1979	Backgrounds	Ten poems and colour etchings based on Jones' experiences
1979	Rhymes for our Times	Reimagined children's nursery rhymes, accompanied by colour prints
1980	Greek Dance	A poem and five etchings about Lindos in Rhodes
1980	Sunflower, Rainflower, Pale Morning Star	Three poems and prints
1983	Scop Hwīlum Sang	'Sometimes a Poet Sang': six etchings inspired by Old English poetry
1984	Impressions	Eight aquatints with poems inspired by Jones' first visit to the USA
1986	A Dark Side of the Sun	Six poems and mezzotints about people 'who live in the shadow of the sun'
1986	Ellor-Gāst	'Alien Spirit': the monsters in Beowulf
1988	The Making of Ellor-Gāst	Short booklet about the difficulties encountered in making Ellor-Gāst
1987	Nocturne for Wales	Five aquatints and short stories about Jones' childhood in the Rhondda Valley
1988	For Gladstone	Stories of a family cat, accompanied by eleven mezzotints
1989	Soft Ground, Hard Ground	Prose and poetry about being a woman, with twelve colour etchings
1990	Five Flowers for My Father	Eulogy to her father, with five prints and prose pieces
1991	Two Moons	Nine mezzotints and poems about those labeled as 'mental defectives'
1992	Ordinary Cats	Six mezzotints and poems about cats
1993	Llym awel	'Sharp the wind': Early Medieval Welsh poetry: translations, introductions and seven prints
1995	Falls the Shadow	Five essays by Jones about idealism and its outcomes, with six prints
1997	Etched in Autumn	Poems and prints responding to Jones' return to Wales and its landscape
1999	Y Morgrugyn Cloff	'The Lame Ant': seven tales from The Mabinogion
2000	Footprints	Twelve mezzotints and short stories about family pets
2002	Etched Out	Five mezzotints and prose pieces about the Epynt clearance
2005	Chwedlau	'Legends': essays by Jones about fifteen centuries of Welsh myths and folklore, with seven prints
2005	Comfort Me With Apples	A collection of previously published poems, prose pieces and translations
2007	Taith Arall - An other journey	'An other journey': a commentary on Giraldus Cambrensis' tour of Wales in 1188.
2009	Terra Contigua	'Border Country': a visual response to the poems of Henry Vaughan and Thomas Traherne
2011	A Thonau Gwyllt y Môr	'And the Wild Waves of the Sea': Five poems and etchings about the coast of medieval Wales
2016	The Quest	The quest of Culhwch and Olwen in The Mabinogion
2019	Mezzotint and the Artist's Book: a forty year journey	An autobiographical account of Jones' printmaking and book production

== Gallery ==
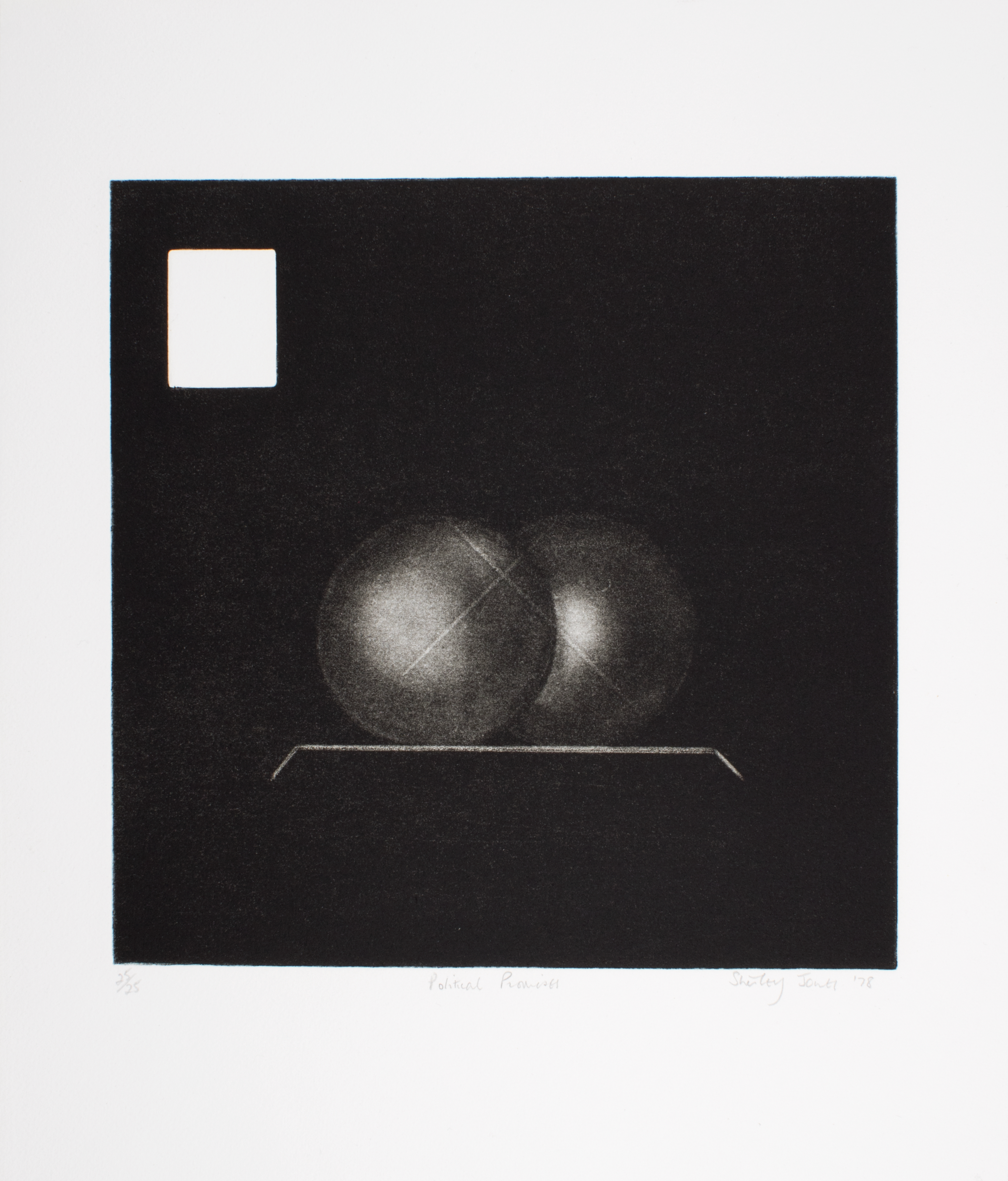
'Political Promises', The Same Sun (1978)

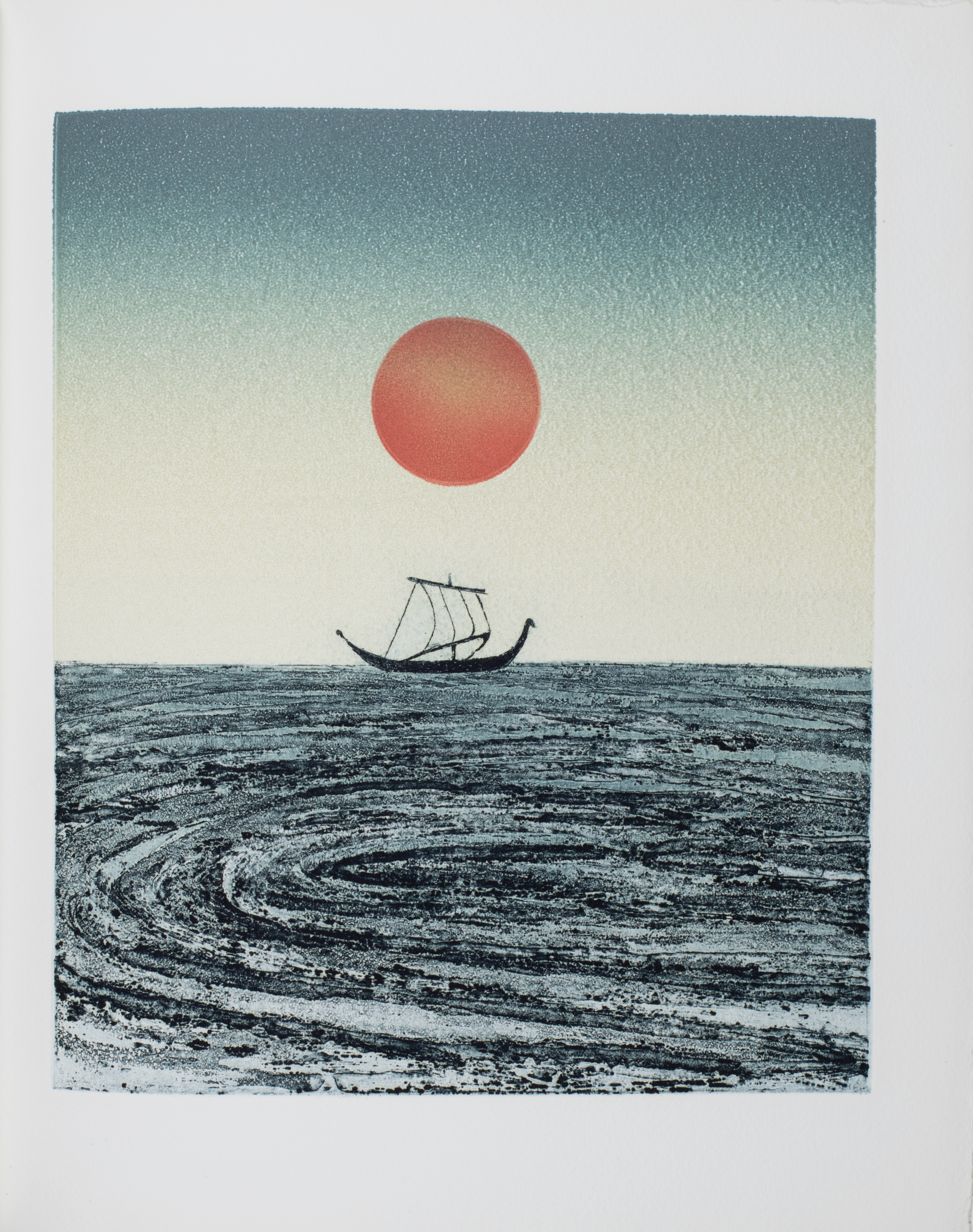
'The Seafarer', Scop Hwīlum Sang (1983)

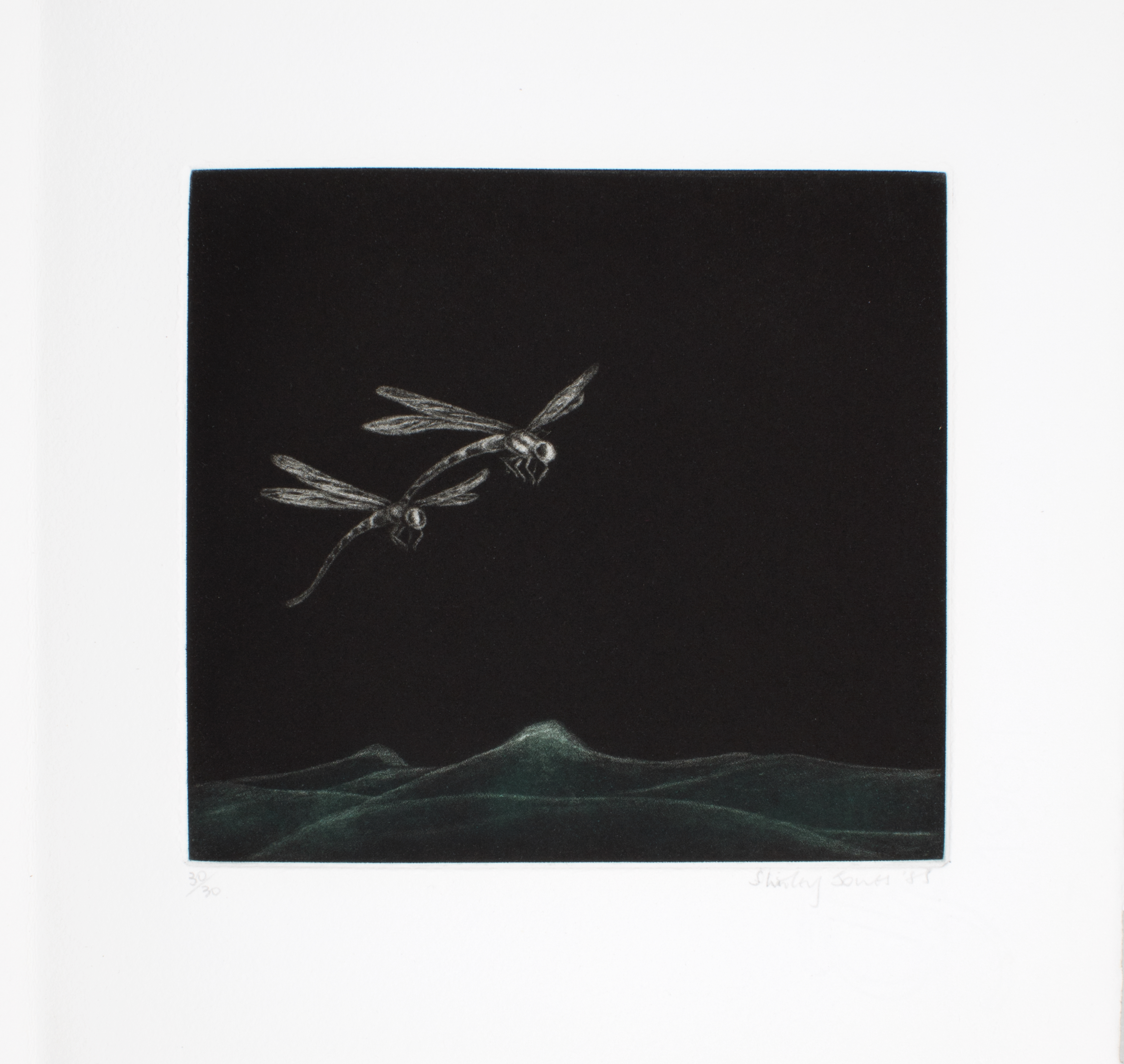
'Hetty', Dark Side of the Sun (1986)

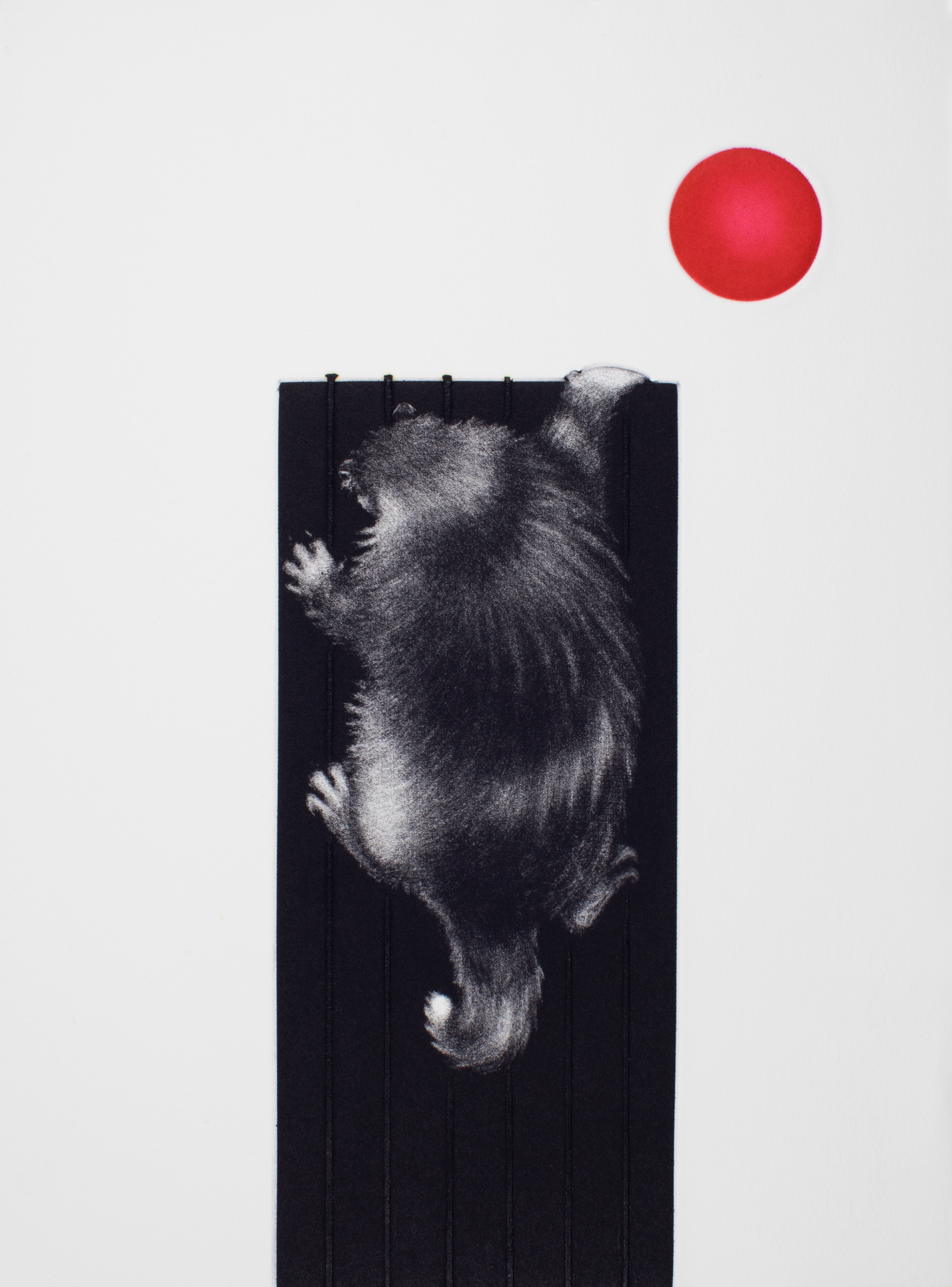
'Gladstone could leap for a five-foot fence', For Gladstone (1988)

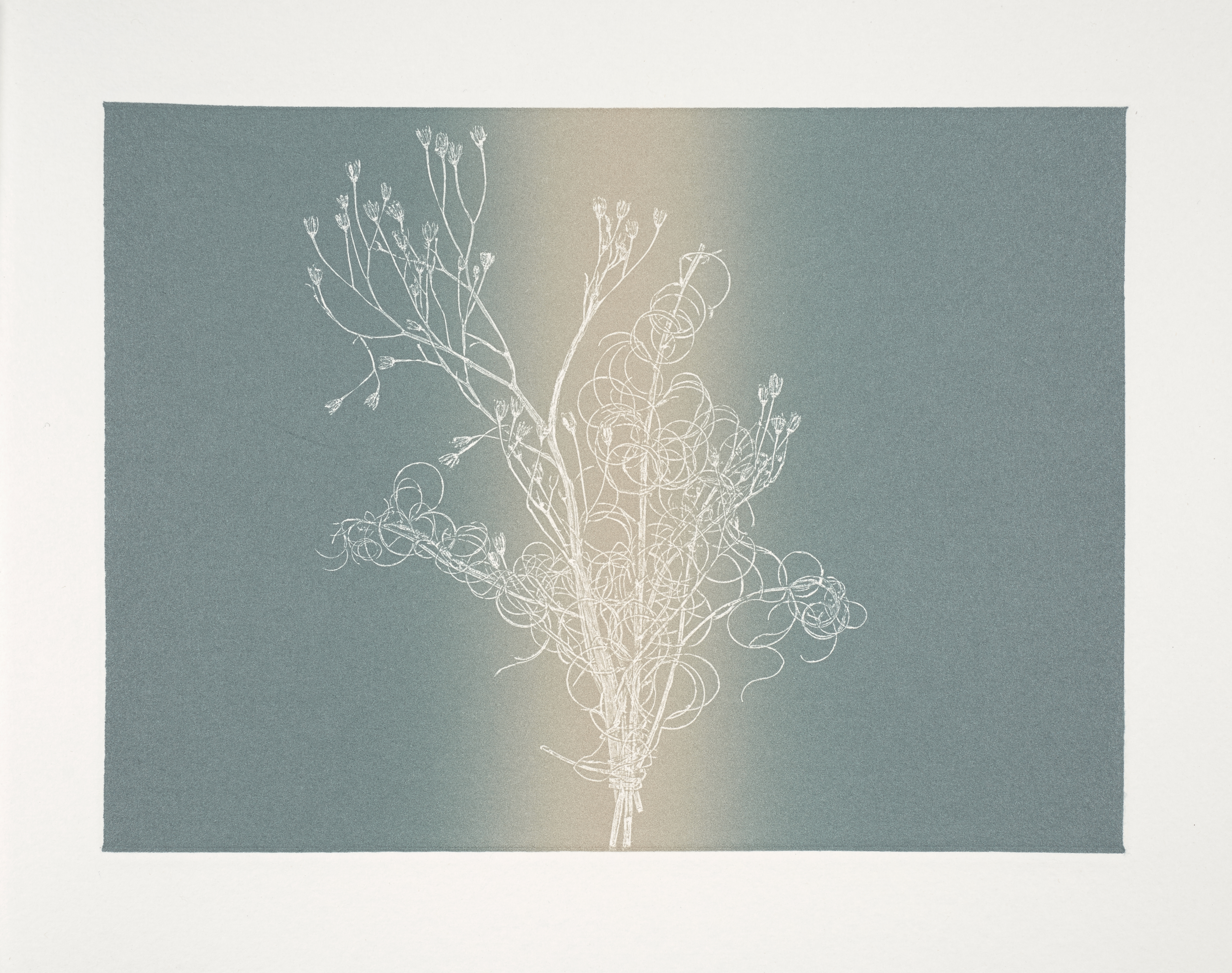
'For the Carers', Soft Ground, Hard Ground (1989)

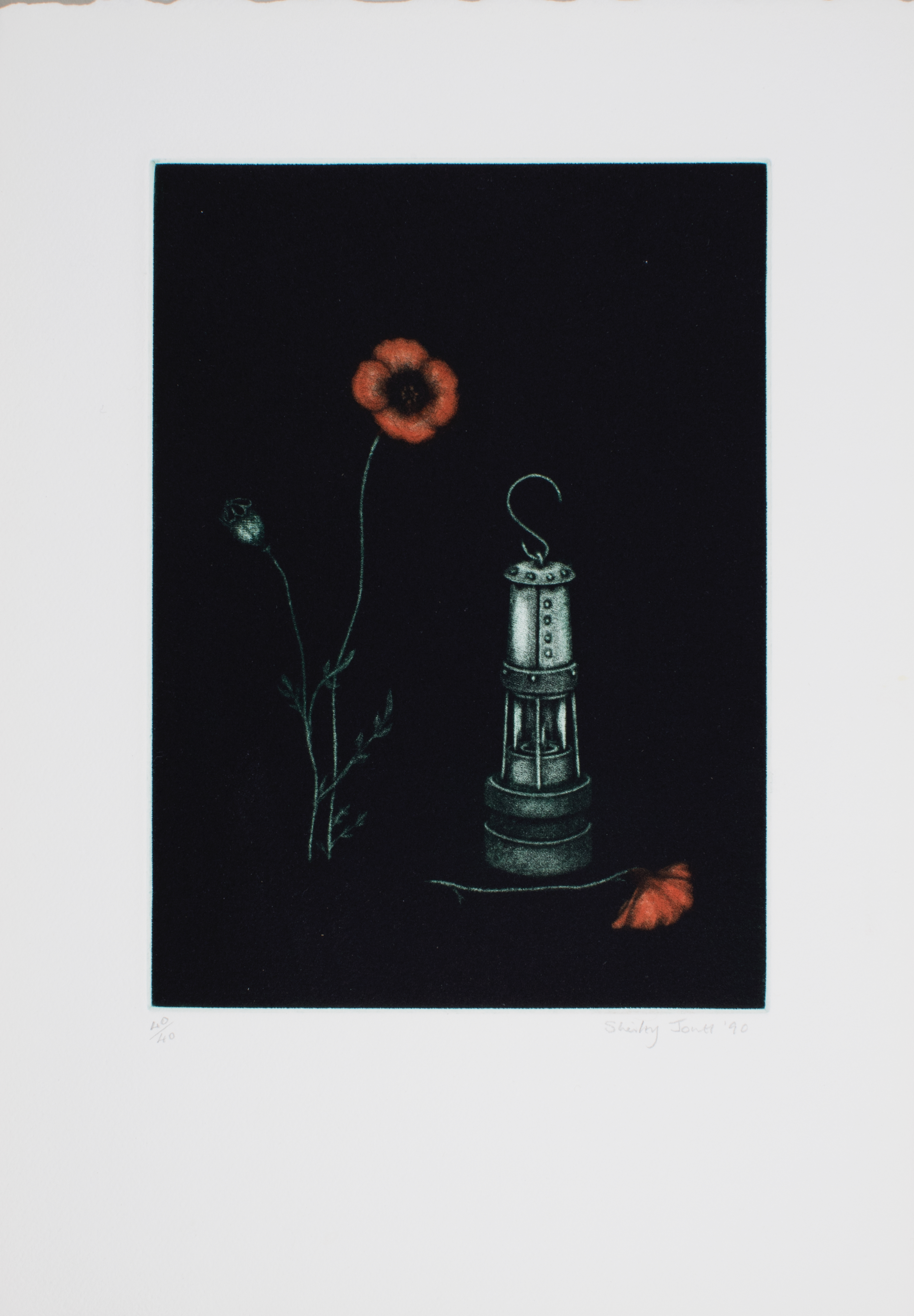
'Miners Lamp', Five Flowers for my Father (1990)

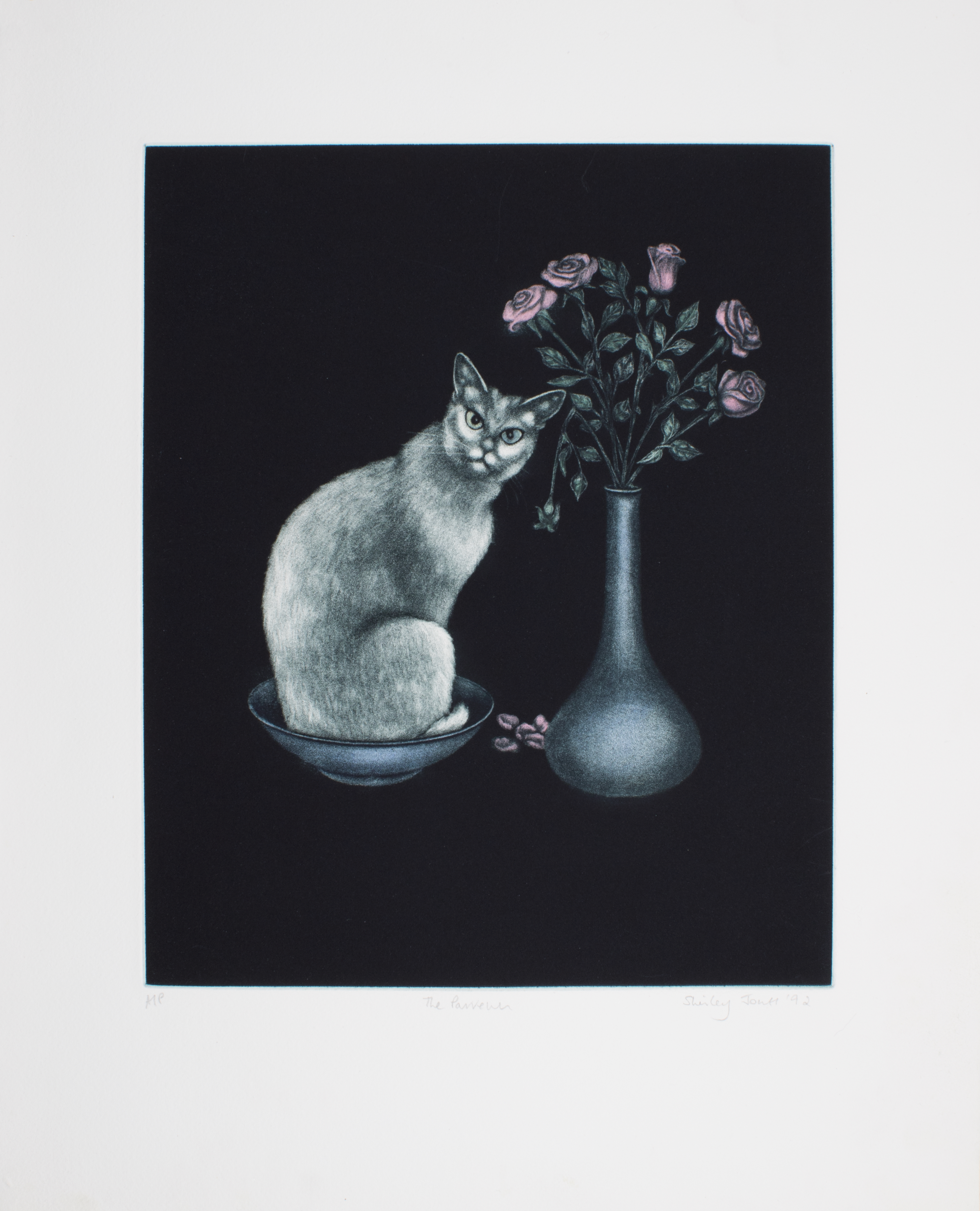
'The Parvenue', Ordinary Cats (1993)

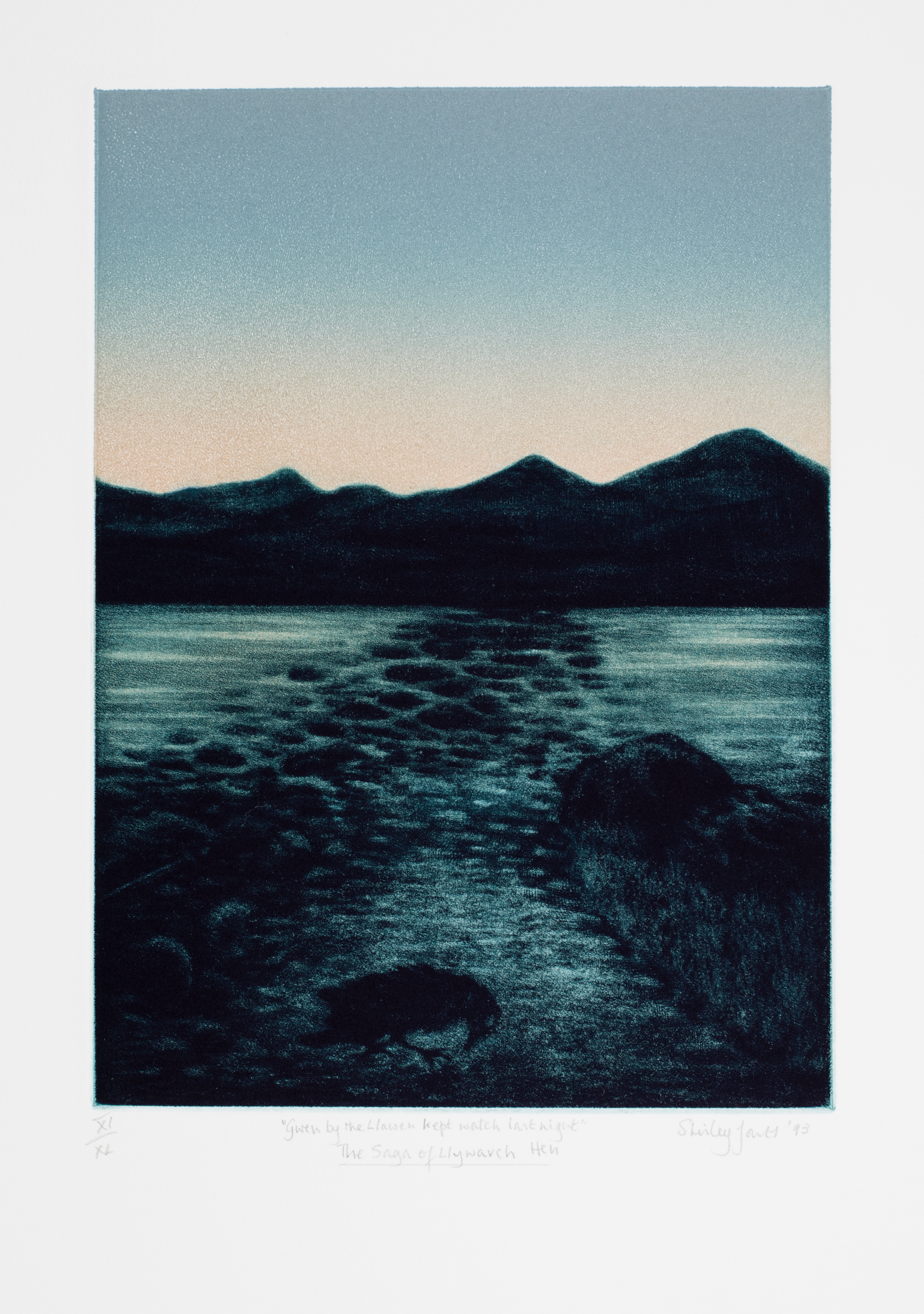
'Gwen by the Llawen kept watch last night', Llym awel (1993)

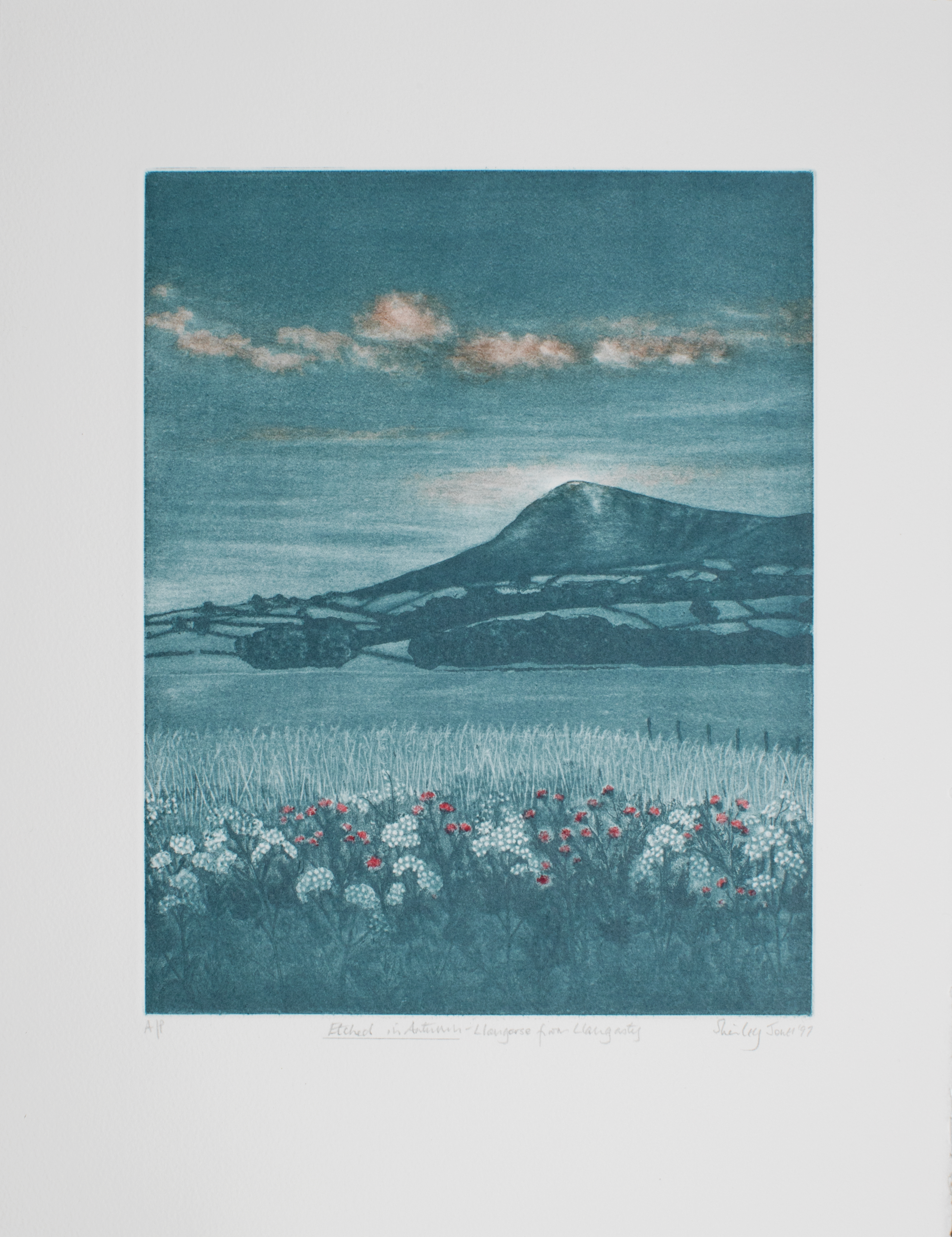
'Llangorse Lake', Etched in Autumn (1997)

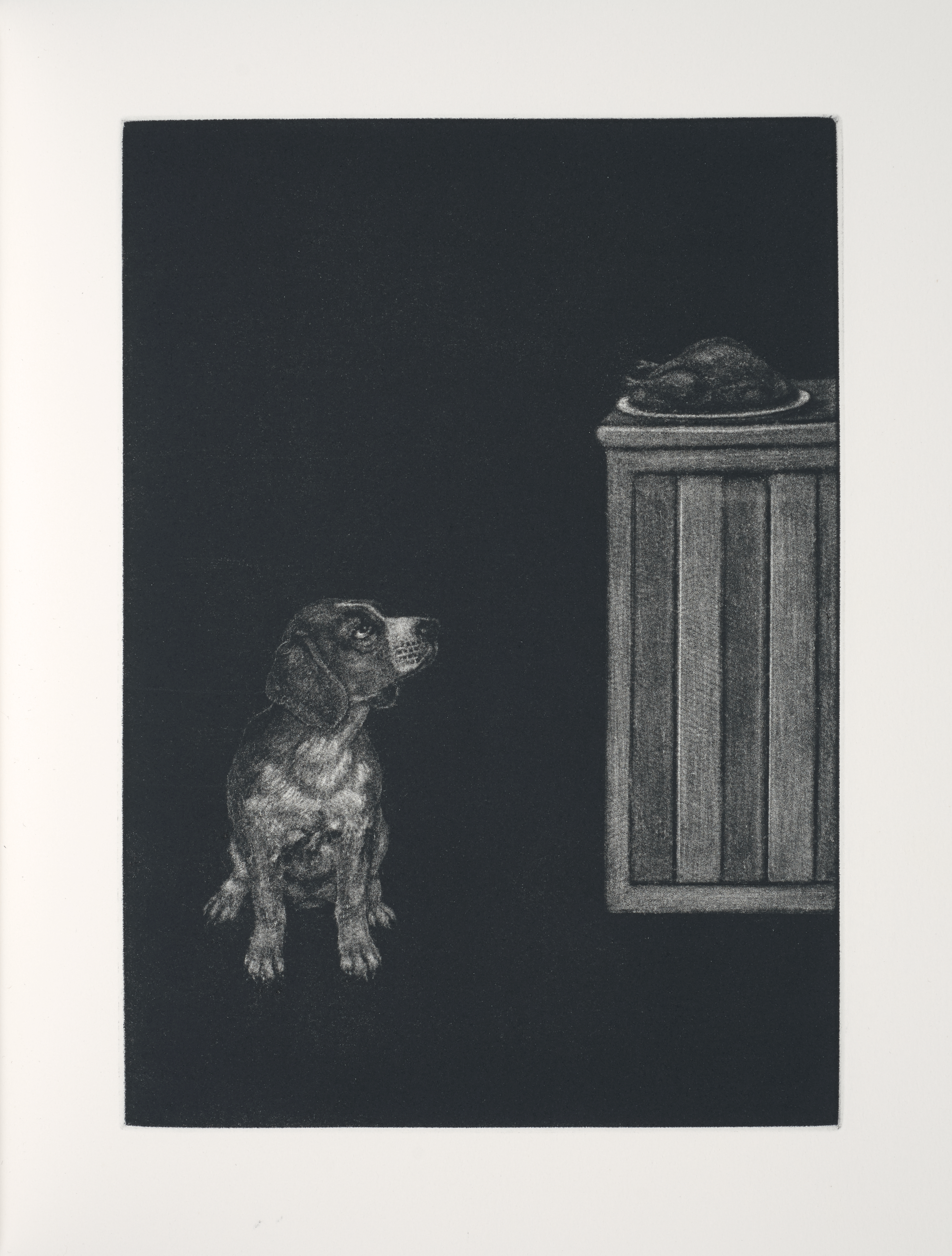
'Cider', Footprints (1999)

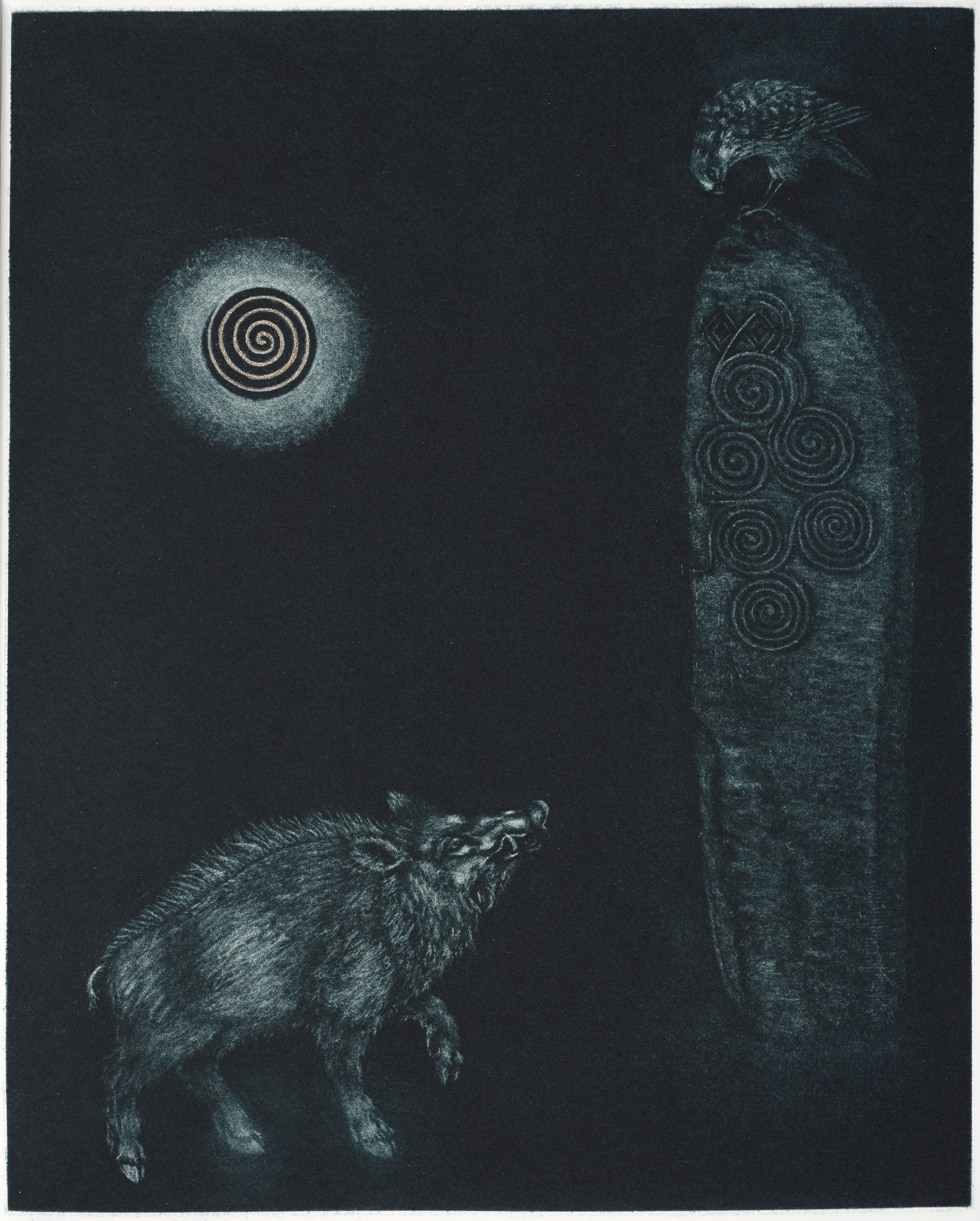
'The Negotiation', Y Morgruygyn Cloff (1999)

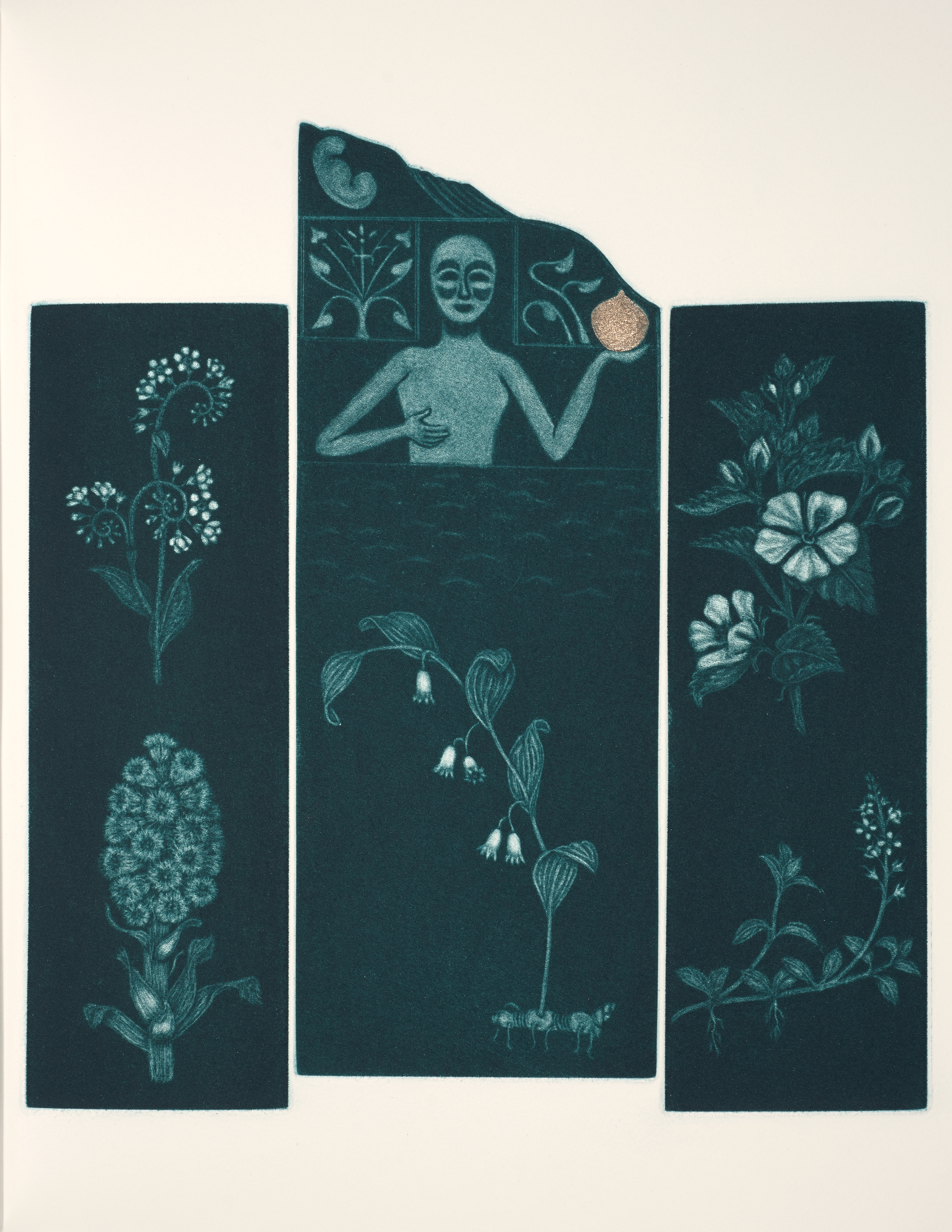
'Llyn y Fan Fach', Chwedlau (2005)

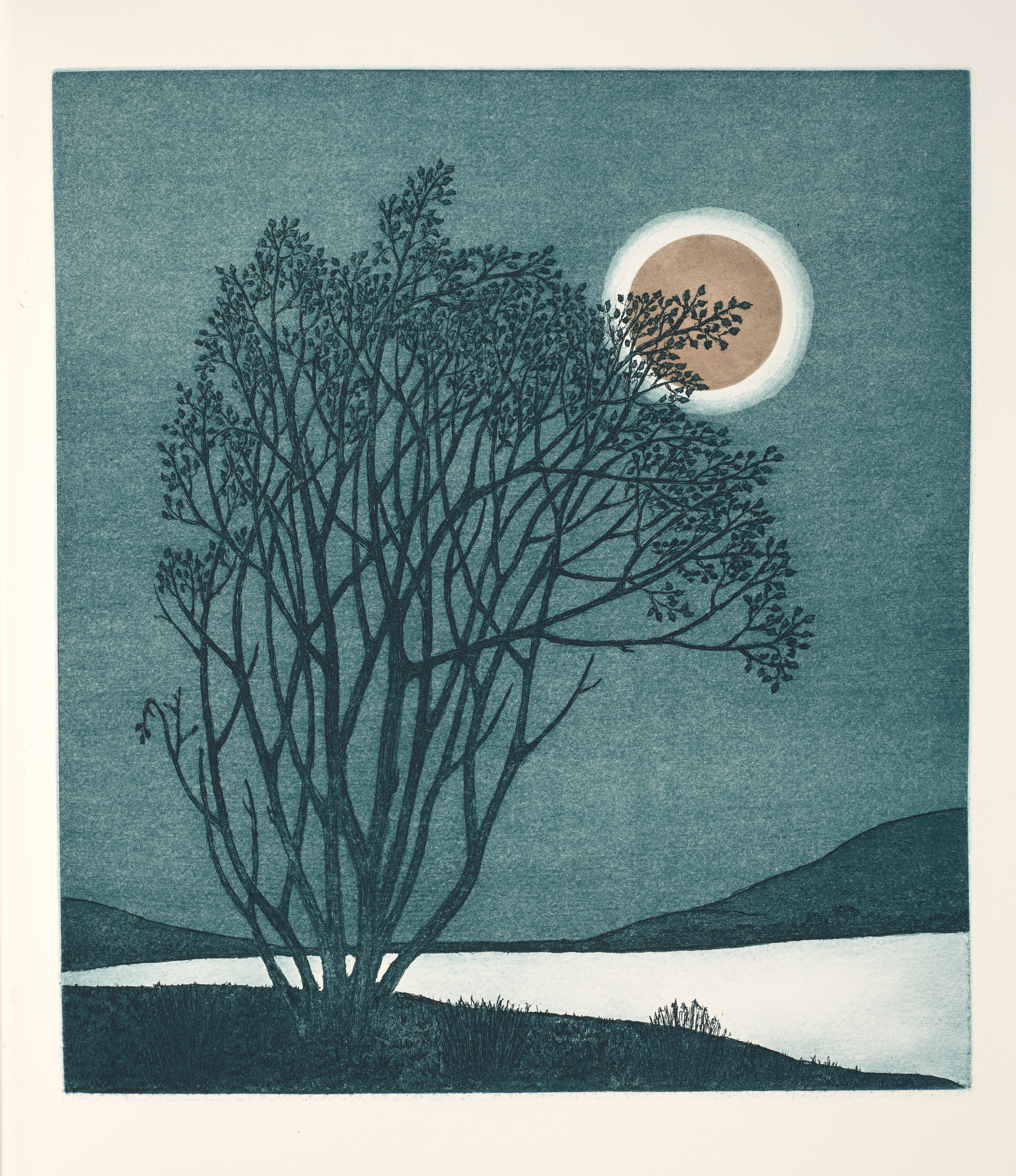
'Y Tylwyth Teg', Chwedlau (2005)

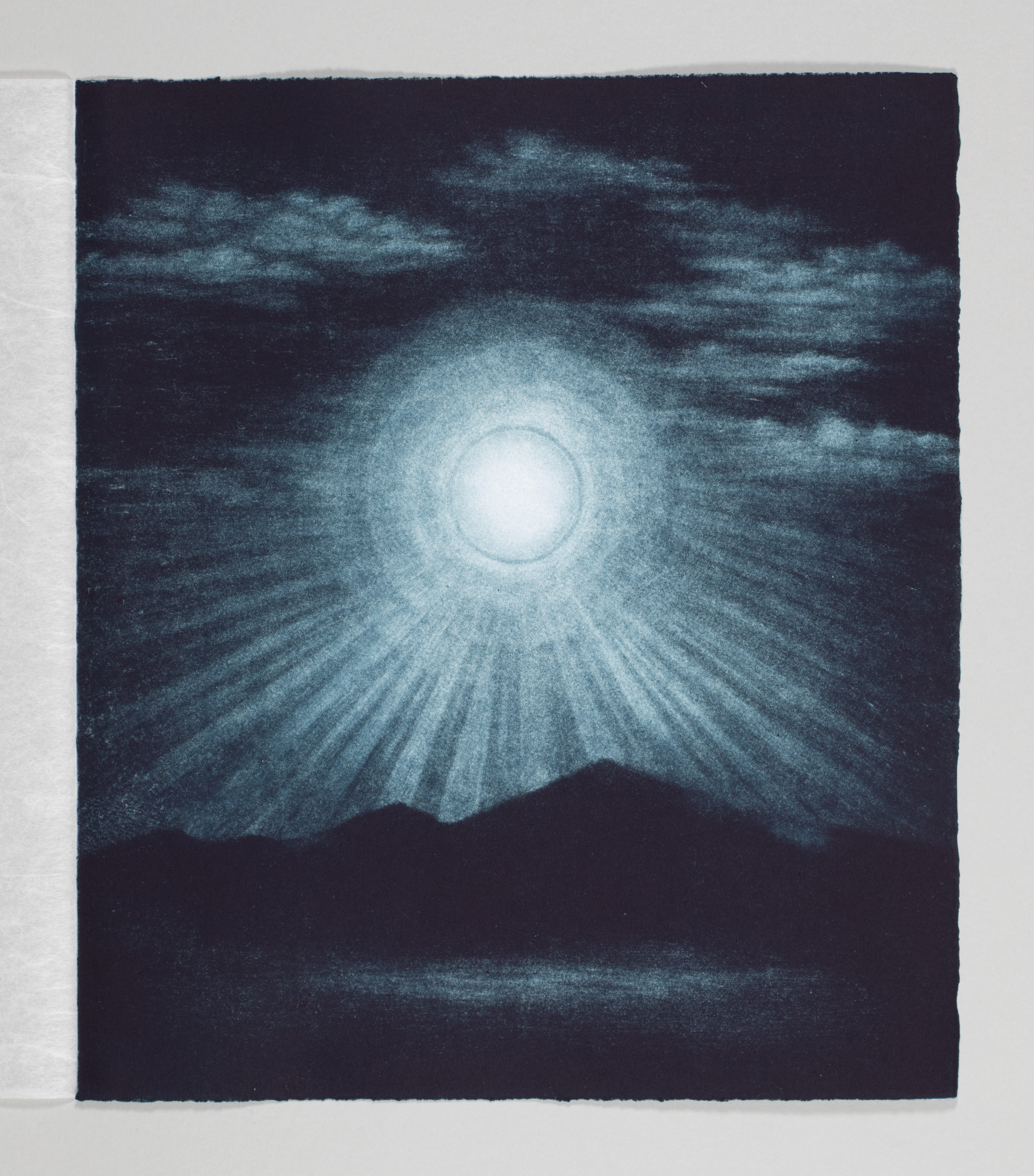
'Eternity', Terra Contigua (2009)

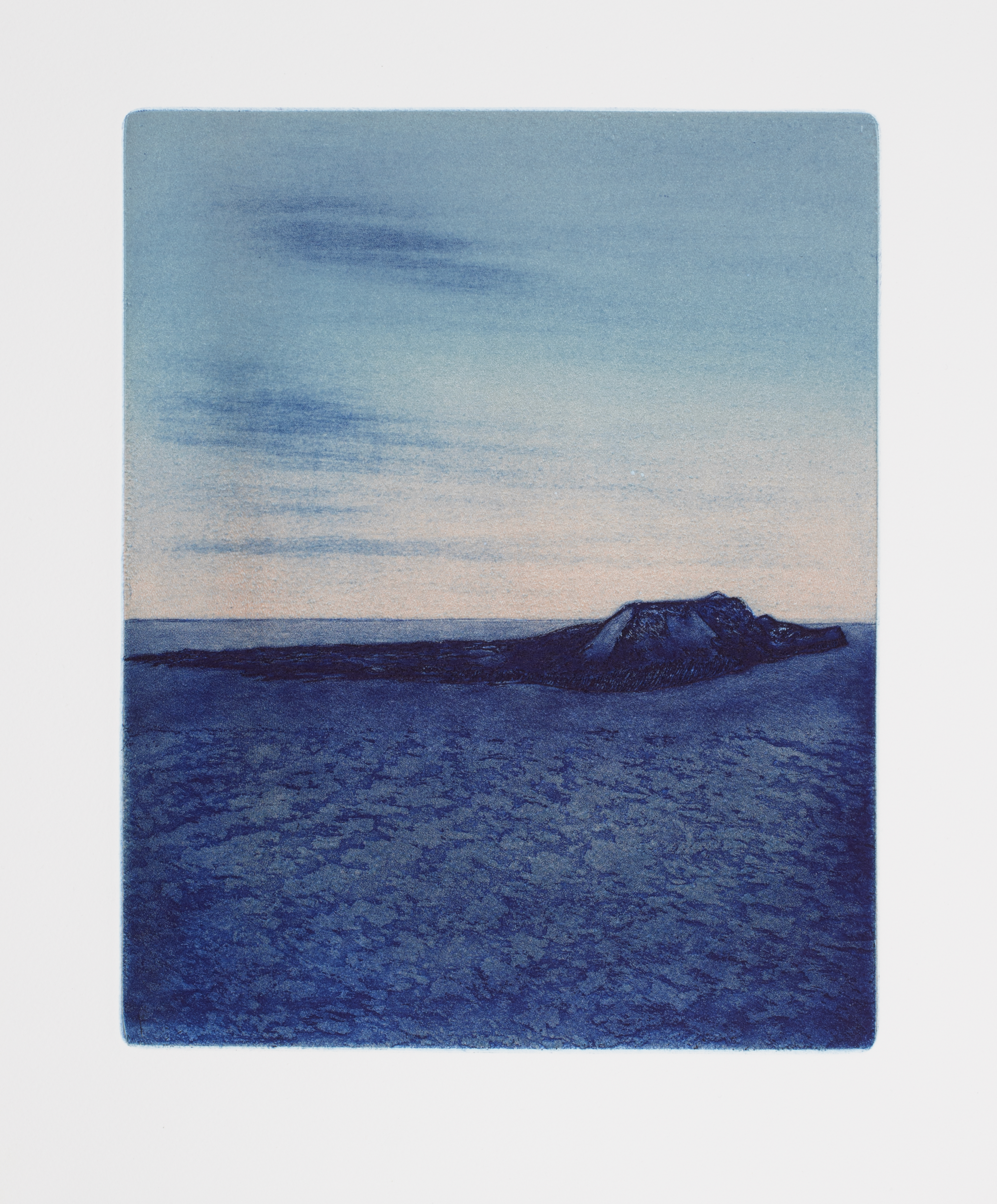
'Worm's Head', A Thonnau Gwyllt y Mor (2011)

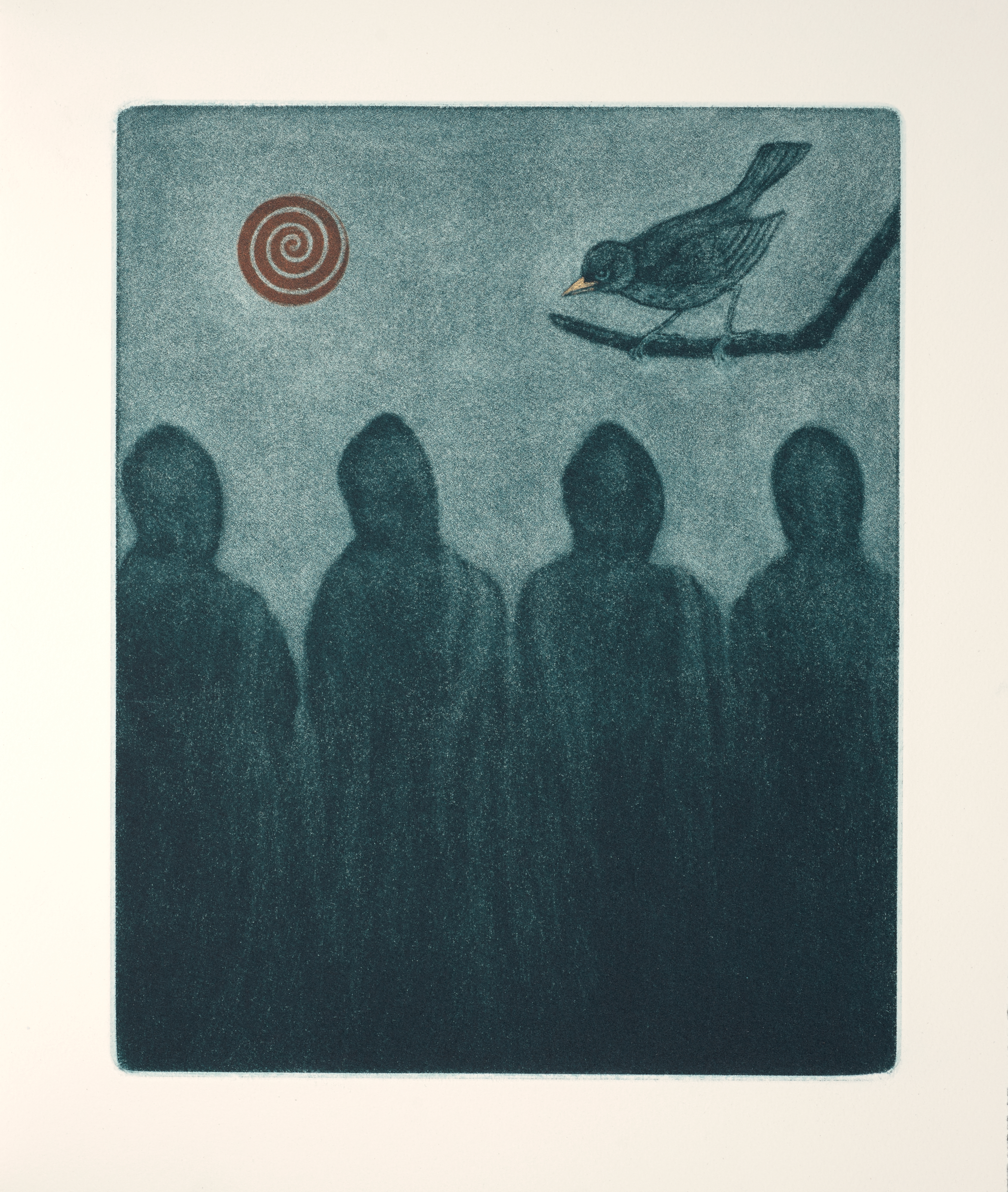
'The Ouzel of Cilgwri', The Quest (2016)

== Bibliography ==
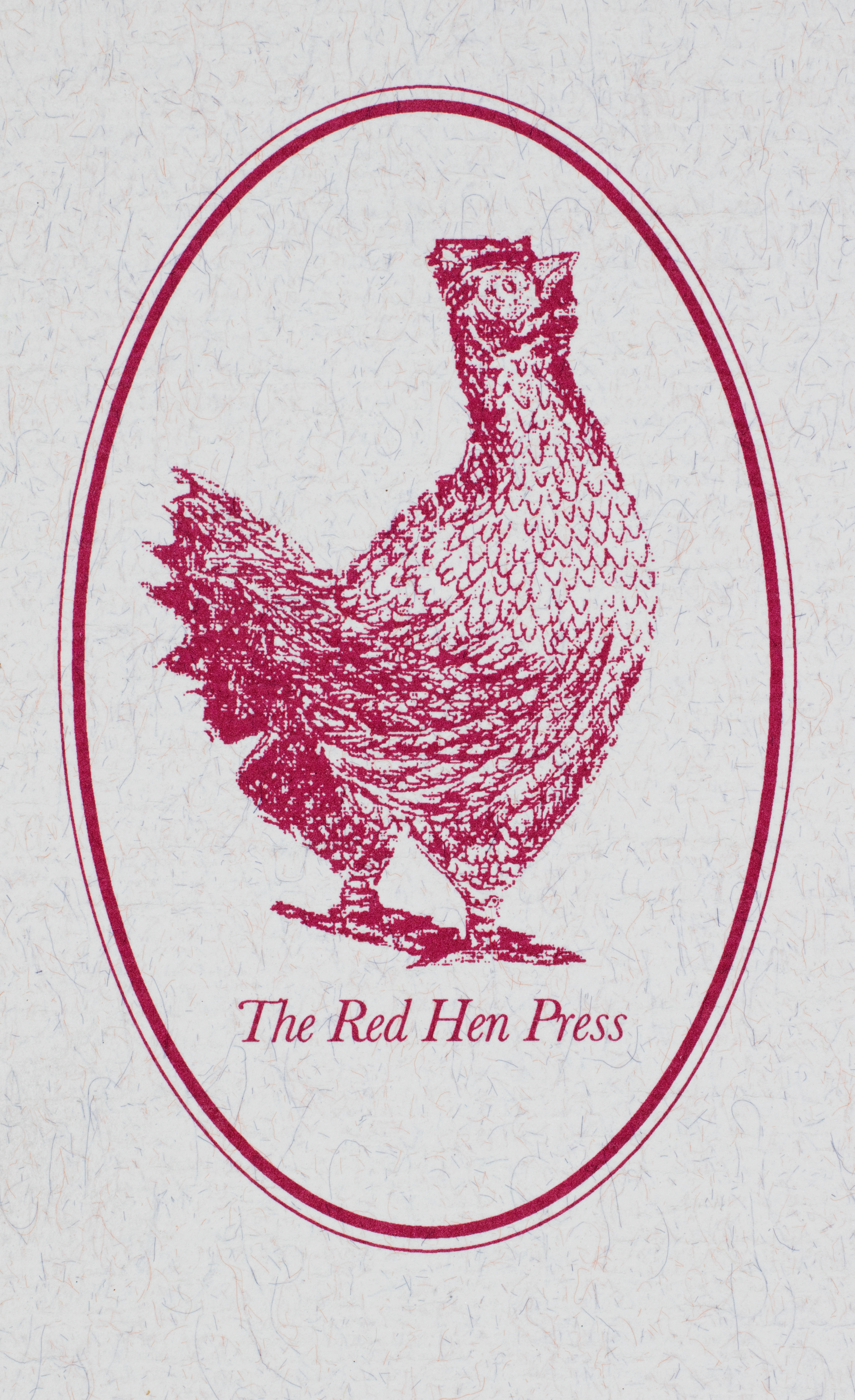
Trademark: The Red Hen Press 1983–

Jones's artwork has been covered in the following books, journals and newspaper articles:

- Suzanne Askham (13 February 1994). 'Balancing the book: on a publisher putting profit second', Financial Times Weekend, p. xiv.
- Beth Cook (April 2000). 'Shirley Jones and the Red Hen Press' Parenthesis, Vol. 4.
- Colin Franklin (Autumn 1998). 'The books and prints of Shirley Jones', The Private Library, pp. 115–123
- Dorothy Harrop (Winter 1996). 'Review of Falls the Shadow', The Private Library, pp. 183–84.
- Dorothy Harrop (1998). 'Private Presses' in Philip Henry Jones and Eiluned Rees (eds.), A Nation and its Books (National Library of Wales & Aberystwyth Centre for the Book), pp. 376–77
- Shirley Jones (2003). The Written Word, the Printed Image: 25 Years of the Red Hen Press: an exhibition of the artists' books and prints by Shirley Jones (Newport Museum and Art Gallery)
- Shirley Jones (2019). Mezzotint and the Artist's Book: a forty year journey (The Red Hen Press)
- Ronald D Patkus (2013). Shirley Jones and the Red Hen Press: a bibliography by Ronald D. Patkus with commentary by the artist Vassar College, USA, 79 pp. ISBN 978-0-615-73243-5
- Anne Price-Owen (Winter 1995). 'Review of Llym Awel (Llanhamlach, Brecon: Red Hen Press)', Printmaking Today, Vol. 4. no. 4, pp. 11–12
- Anne Price-Owen (1999). 'Review of Y Morgrugyn Cloff (Llanhamlach, Brecon: Red Hen Press)', Printmaking Today, Vol. 9. no. 4, p. 33
