= Ludwig von Siegen =

Renaissance-era German military officer and amateur artist

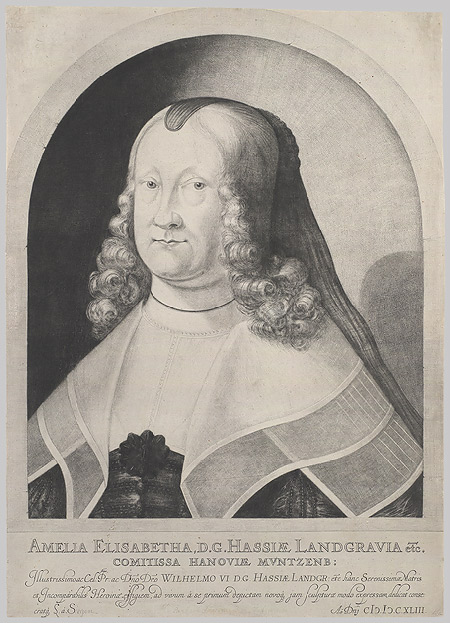
Portrait of Amelie Elisabeth von Hessen, the first known mezzotint, by Ludwig von Siegen, 1642

Ludwig von Siegen (c. March 1609 Cologne – c. 1680 Wolfenbüttel, Germany) was a German soldier and amateur engraver, who invented the printmaking technique of mezzotint, a printing-process reliant on mechanical pressure used to print more complex engravings than previously possible. He was a well-educated aristocrat, and a Lieutenant-Colonel who commanded the personal guard of William VI, Landgrave of Hesse-Kassel (or Hesse-Cassel), and acted as a personal aide to the ruler, with the title kammerjunker or Chamberlain.

== Early life ==
Siegen came from an aristocratic family, and may have been born in the family castle of Von Sechten near Cologne, not in Utrecht, as traditionally believed, as he was baptised in Cologne March 1609. His mother had died (perhaps in his birth) and his father moved to Holland when Ludwig was young, apparently because of his Calvinist beliefs. Here his father remarried, to an Anna Perez, a widow from Spain, also adopting her son Marcus Perez. Anna died in 1619 leaving Johann to resolve the future of both boys (Ludwig and Marcus). He obtained a place in a German school for Marcus but Ludwig remained in Holland with his step-mother's family to avoid the dangers of the recently begun Thirty Years War in Germany.

Sechten was in Hesse-Kassel, and his father Johann von Siegen became an advisor to the Landgrave, Maurice, who in 1620 appointed him chancellor of the Collegium Mauritaneum, a school for young aristocrats which Siegen attended from 1621 to 1626. Then he studied law at the Hohe Schule in Herborn. His father moved to Holland again in 1627, when the new Landgrave William V dissolved the Collegium Mauritaneum.

Little is known about Siegen's life between 1629 and 1639, when he asked William V's widow, now Regent for her son William VI, for a position. He may have seen active military service in these missing years in the middle of the Thirty Years War. He was appointed kammerjunker, which as the Landgrave was a minor, may have been effectively a tutorial position, as well as head of the personal guard of the ruler.

By 1641 he had decided to convert to Catholicism, which in the atmosphere of the Thirty Years War would not have been compatible with his position in the strictly Calvinistic court of Hesse-Kassel. After some friction at court, he therefore repeated his father's move to Holland, although for the opposite reason. He moved to Amsterdam in 1641 and announced his conversion there, remaining in contact with his former employers and sending them works of art he produced, sometimes commissioned by them.

== Invention of mezzotint ==
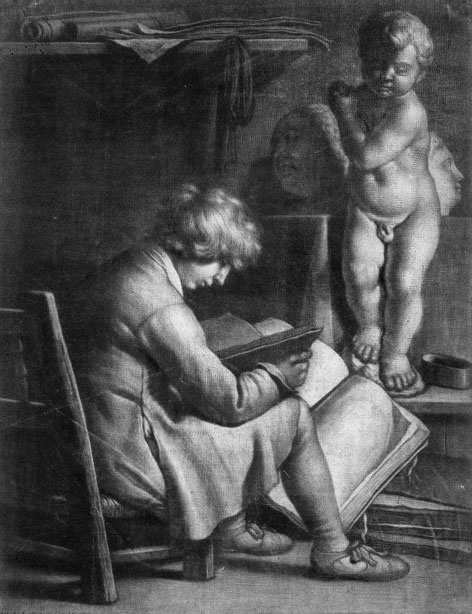
Early mezzotint by Vaillerant, Siegen's assistant or tutor. Young man reading, with statue of Cupid. 27,5 x 21,3 cm

In Amsterdam Siegen must have been aware of Rembrandt's increasingly tonal etchings, achieved by conventional methods, filling in the dark areas by repeated lines. In Italy at the same time Giovanni Benedetto Castiglione was also exploring the possibilities of tonality in printmaking, leading him to invent monotyping at almost the same moment as Siegen invented mezzotint. Mezzotint achieves tonality by roughening the plate with thousands of little dots made by a metal tool with small teeth.

In a letter of 6 March 1641 to the Landgravine, Siegen announced that he had begun a portrait of her, and hinted that he would appreciate some money. News of his conversion had just reached the court, and the response seems to have been restrained. In August 1642, he finally finished the first known mezzotint engraving, a portrait of the Landgravine Amalia Elisabeth, Regent of Hesse-Kassel, the widow of his former employer. He sent this to her son, Landgrave William VI with a letter explaining that he had invented the process:

".... I could not pass up dedicating such a rare and previously unseen work of art in humble honour before anyone else to your highness who is an extraordinary connoisseur of art. The way this work is made, no engraver or artist could explain or guess.".

The portrait contains a range of tones from the lace collars to the background, illustrating the mezzotint process.

He worked from "light to dark", only roughening the plate where he wanted to produce tones, using "roulettes" or wheels with sharp teeth. This is unlike most later mezzotinters, who first roughened the whole plate, then scraped or burnished the roughness away where they wanted lighter tones, so working from "dark to light".

In 1643–44, he produced portraits of Elizabeth of Bohemia, (the "Winter Queen", daughter of James I of England), William II of Orange and his wife, Mary, all after paintings by Gerard van Honthorst. All were perhaps potential employers.

In 1654 he did a large portrait of Ferdinand III, Holy Roman Emperor from memory, having seen him at the Diet in Regensburg. He distributed copies to the various princes gathered there, without attracting further commissions.

Apart from portraits he did a St Bruno and in 1657 copied a Holy Family with St John the Baptist by Annibale Carracci. His total mezzotint production was these seven plates, although he also produced paintings and medals.

== Siegen's later career ==
After he left Amsterdam in 1644, Siegen first entered the armies of the Catholic Bishop of Hildesheim, and then those of the Archbishop of Cologne. In 1654, he went into the service of the Archbishop-Elector of Mainz as a Colonel retired from active service and then to the Protestant Augustus the Younger, Duke of Brunswick-Lüneburg at Wolfenbüttel, where he remained after retirement. Most documents after this relate to lawsuits over estates and inheritances, the last mention being in 1676.

== Prince Rupert of the Rhine ==
Prince Rupert of the Rhine (i.e. of the Palatinate), a famous Royalist commander in the English Civil War, was the cousin of William VI of Hesse-Kassel, and the son of Elizabeth of Bohemia. Prince Rupert was also an amateur artist, and in about 1654 learned of the process, either from his cousin, or possibly from Siegen himself - whether they ever met is a point of scholarly controversy. A number of letters between Rupert and William referring to the technique survive from the period following 1654.

Rupert produced some stylish mezzotints himself, and through him, after his return to England with the English Restoration in 1660, the invention became known there, which was to be the main home of the technique. Rupert described it to John Evelyn, who published it (in very enigmatic terms) for the first time in 1662, crediting Rupert with the invention:

" Of the new way of Engraving, or Mezzo Tinto, Invented, and communicated by his Highnesse Prince RUPERT, Count Palatine of Rhyne, &c."

However Rupert probably did invent the "rocker", a wide curved tool with teeth, used to roughen a whole plate, which was an essential tool in the developed technique. Rupert's artistic assistant or tutor Wallerant Vaillant (1623–77) was the first to adopt the process commercially, in Amsterdam in the 1660s.

== Sources ==
- Carol Wax, The Mezzotint: History and Technique (Harry N. Abrams, Inc., 1990)
