= Mezzotint =

Printmaking technique

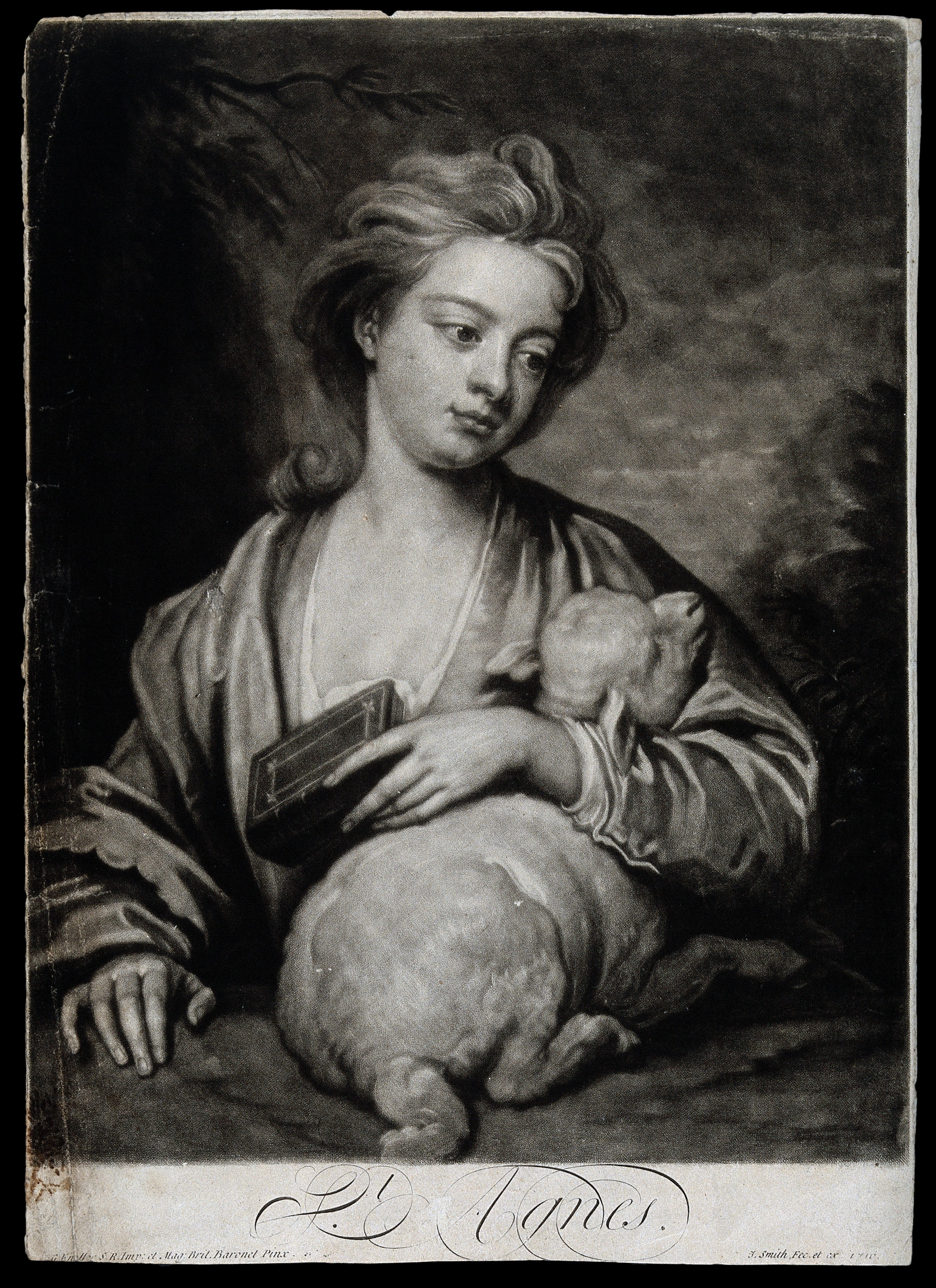
Saint Agnes, mezzotint by John Smith after Godfrey Kneller, usually thought to be a portrait of Kneller's daughter, Catherine Voss

Mezzotint is a monochrome printmaking process of the intaglio family. It was the first printing process that yielded half-tones without using line- or dot-based techniques like hatching, cross-hatching or stipple. Mezzotint achieves tonality by roughening a metal plate with thousands of little dots made by a metal tool with small teeth, called a "rocker". In printing, the tiny pits in the plate retain the ink when the face of the plate is wiped clean. This technique can achieve a high level of quality and richness in the print, and produce a furniture print which is large and bold enough to be framed and hung effectively in a room.

Mezzotint is often combined with other intaglio techniques, usually etching and engraving, including stipple engraving. The process was especially widely used in England from the eighteenth century, and in France was called la manière anglaise (“the English manner”). Until the 20th century it has mostly been used for reproductive prints to reproduce portraits and other paintings, rather than for original compositions. From the mid-18th century it was somewhat in competition with the other main tonal technique of the day, aquatint.

Since the mid-nineteenth century it has been relatively little used, as lithography and other techniques produced comparable results more easily. Sir Frank Short (1857–1945) was an important pioneer of the mezzotint revival in the United Kingdom along with Peter Ilsted (1864–1933) in Denmark.

Mezzotint is known for the luxurious quality of its tones: first, because an evenly, finely roughened surface holds a lot of ink, allowing deep solid colours to be printed; secondly because the process of smoothing the plate with burin, burnisher and scraper allows fine gradations in tone to be developed. The scraper is a triangular ended tool, and the burnisher has a smooth round end – not unlike many spoon handles.

== History ==
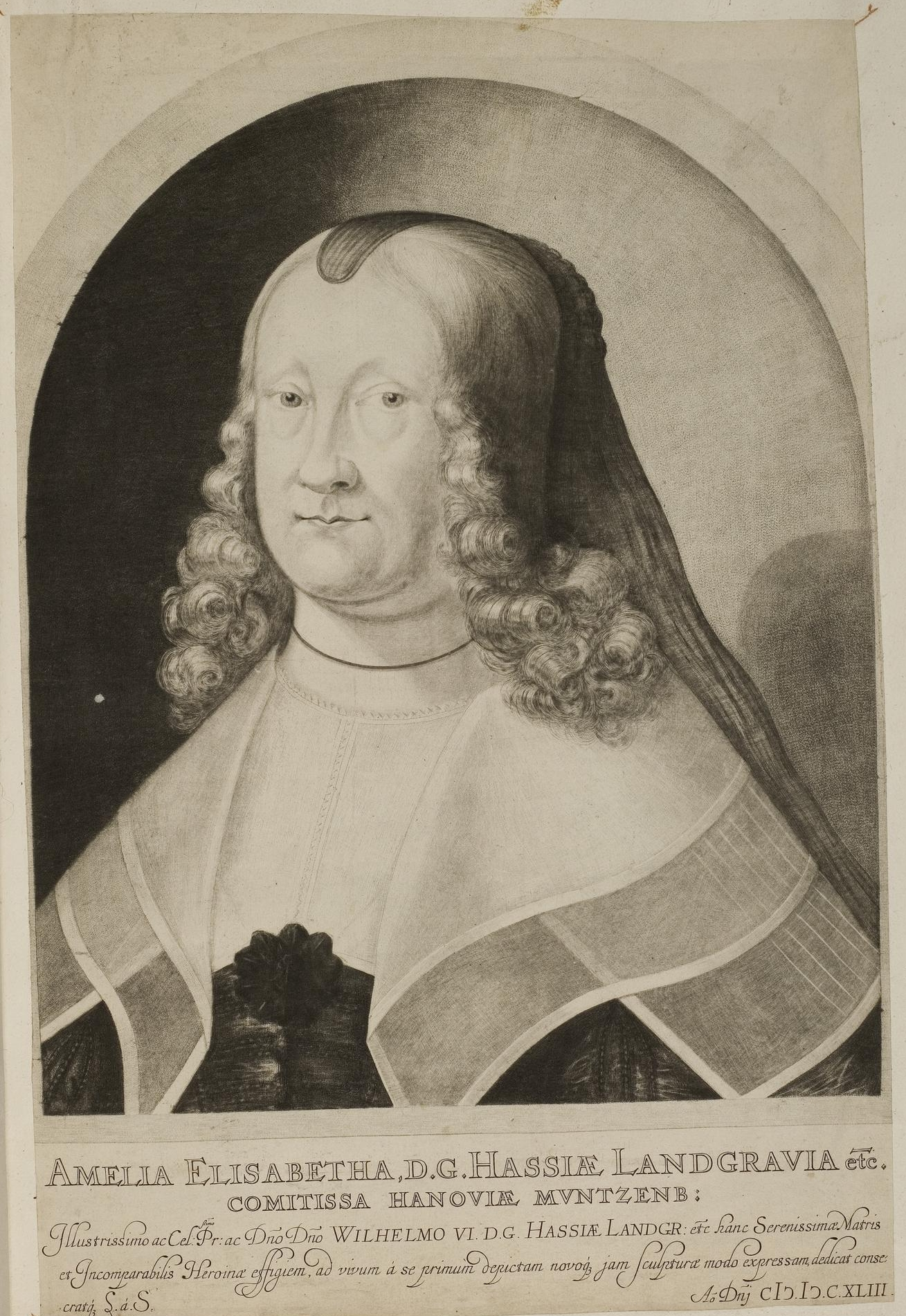
Ludwig von Siegen, Countess Amalie Elisabeth of Hanau-Münzenberg, 1642, is the first known mezzotint, using the light to dark method.

The mezzotint printmaking method was invented by the German soldier and amateur artist Ludwig von Siegen (1609 – c. 1680). His earliest mezzotint print dates to 1642 and is a portrait of Countess Amalie Elisabeth of Hanau-Münzenberg, regent for her son, and von Siegen's employer. This was made by working from light to dark. The rocker seems to have been invented by Prince Rupert of the Rhine, a famous cavalry commander in the English Civil War, who was the next to use the process, and took it to England.

Sir Peter Lely saw the potential for using it to publicise his portraits, and encouraged a number of Dutch printmakers to come to England. Godfrey Kneller worked closely with John Smith, who is said to have lived in his house for a period; he created about 500 mezzotints, some 300 copies of portrait paintings. In the next century over 400 mezzotints after portraits by Sir Joshua Reynolds are known, by various hands.

British mezzotint collecting was a great craze from about 1760 to the Great Crash of 1929, also spreading to America. The main area of collecting was British portraits; hit oil paintings from the Royal Academy Summer Exhibition were routinely, and profitably, reproduced in mezzotint throughout this period, and other mezzotinters reproduced older portraits of historical figures, or if necessary, made them up. The favourite period to collect was roughly from 1750 to 1820, the great period of the British portrait. There were two basic styles of collection: some concentrated on making a complete collection of material within a certain scope, while others aimed at perfect condition and quality (which declines in mezzotints after a relatively small number of impressions are taken from a plate), and in collecting the many "proof states" which artists and printers had obligingly provided for them from early on. Leading collectors included William Eaton, 2nd Baron Cheylesmore and the Irishman John Chaloner Smith.

Frank Short, Ebb Tide, Putney Bridge, 1885

In the first half of the 19th century, the "mixed" technique was popular in England, with other intaglio techniques, often used to start a plate off, combined with mezzotint. Mezzotint was also often used for landscapes, being especially suited to rather gloomy British skies and twilights, that were popular subjects in the Victorian Etching Revival.

Continental use of the technique was much less; in the late 17th century Abraham Bloteling was one of a number of Amsterdam printmakers to use it, but in the 18th century only Augsburg (Johann Jacob Haid and Johann Elias Ridinger), Nuremberg and Vienna (Ignaz Unterberger) had schools, led by artists following London styles.

During the 20th century the technique went into decline, in great part because it was so time consuming to rock the plates. Rare proponents include Yozo Hamaguchi, Leonard Marchant and Shirley Jones. Wider interest in learning and using the technique revived after the publication in 1990 of the book The Mezzotint: History and Technique by artist Carol Wax. The Wax book was responsible for a substantial upsurge in the number of artists creating mezzotints in the United States and worldwide.

== Light to dark method ==
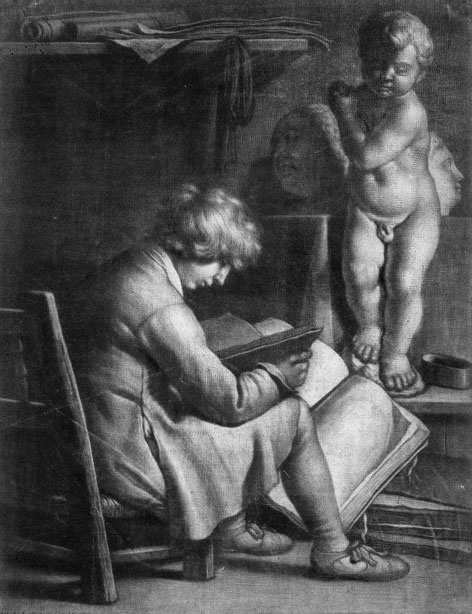
Early mezzotint by Wallerant Vaillant, Siegen's assistant or tutor. Young man reading, with statue of Cupid. Probably made using light to dark technique. 27.5 cm × 21.3 cm (10 13/16 in × 8 3/8 in)

The first mezzotints by Ludwig von Siegen were made using the light to dark method. The metal plate was tooled to create indentations and parts of the image that were to stay light in tone were kept smooth. This method was referred to as the 'Additive method'; that is, adding areas of indentations to the plate for the areas of the print that were to appear darker in tone. This technique meant that it was possible to create the image directly by only roughening a blank plate selectively, where the darker parts of the image are to be. By varying the degree of smoothing, mid-tones between black and white can be created, hence the name mezzo-tinto which is Italian for "half-tone" or "half-painted".

== Dark to light method ==
This became the most common method. The whole surface (usually) of a metal, usually copper, plate is roughened evenly, manually with a rocker, or mechanically. If the plate were printed at this point it would show as solid black. The image is then created by selectively burnishing areas of the surface of the metal plate with metal tools; the smoothed parts will print lighter than those areas not smoothed by the burnishing tool. Areas smoothed completely flat will not hold ink at all; such areas will print "white," that is, the colour of the paper without ink. This is called working from "dark to light", or the "subtractive" method. It was first used by Prince Rupert of the Rhine. The all-over roughening does not require huge skill, and was normally done by an apprentice.

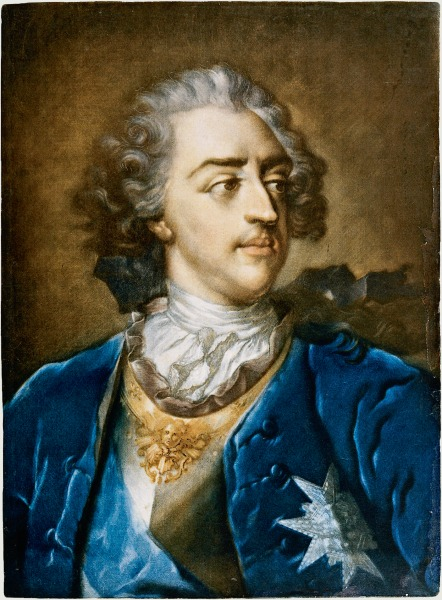
Four-colour mezzotint of Louis XV by Jacob Christoph Le Blon, 1739

Two great advantages of the technique were that it was easier to learn and also much faster than engraving proper, as well as giving a rich range of tones. Mezzotints could be produced very quickly to respond to or depict events or people in the news, and larger sizes of print were relatively easy to produce. This was crucial for what was known at the time as the furniture print, a mezzotint that was large enough and with sufficiently bold tonal contrasts to hold its own framed and hung on the wall of a room. Since mezzotints were far cheaper than paintings, this was a great attraction.

=== Colour ===
Jacob Christoph Le Blon (1667-1741) used the dark to light method and invented the three and four-colour mezzotint printing technique by using a separate metal plate for each colour. Le Blon's colour printing method applied the RYB colour model approach whereby red, yellow and blue were used to create a larger range of colour shades. In Coloritto, his book of 1725, Le Blon refers to red, yellow and blue as "primitive" colours and that red and yellow make orange; red and blue, make purple/violet; and blue and yellow make green (Le Blon, 1725, p. 6). A similar process was used in France later in the century by Le Blon's pupil Jacques-Fabien Gautier-Dagoty and his sons; their work included anatomical illustrations for medical books. Other black and white prints were hand-coloured in watercolour, which was especially useful after the plate became worn.

== Printing ==
Printing the finished plate is the same for either method, and follows the normal way for an intaglio plate; the whole surface is inked, the ink is then wiped off the surface to leave ink only in the pits of the still rough areas below the original surface of the plate. The plate is put through a high-pressure printing press next to a sheet of paper, and the process repeated.

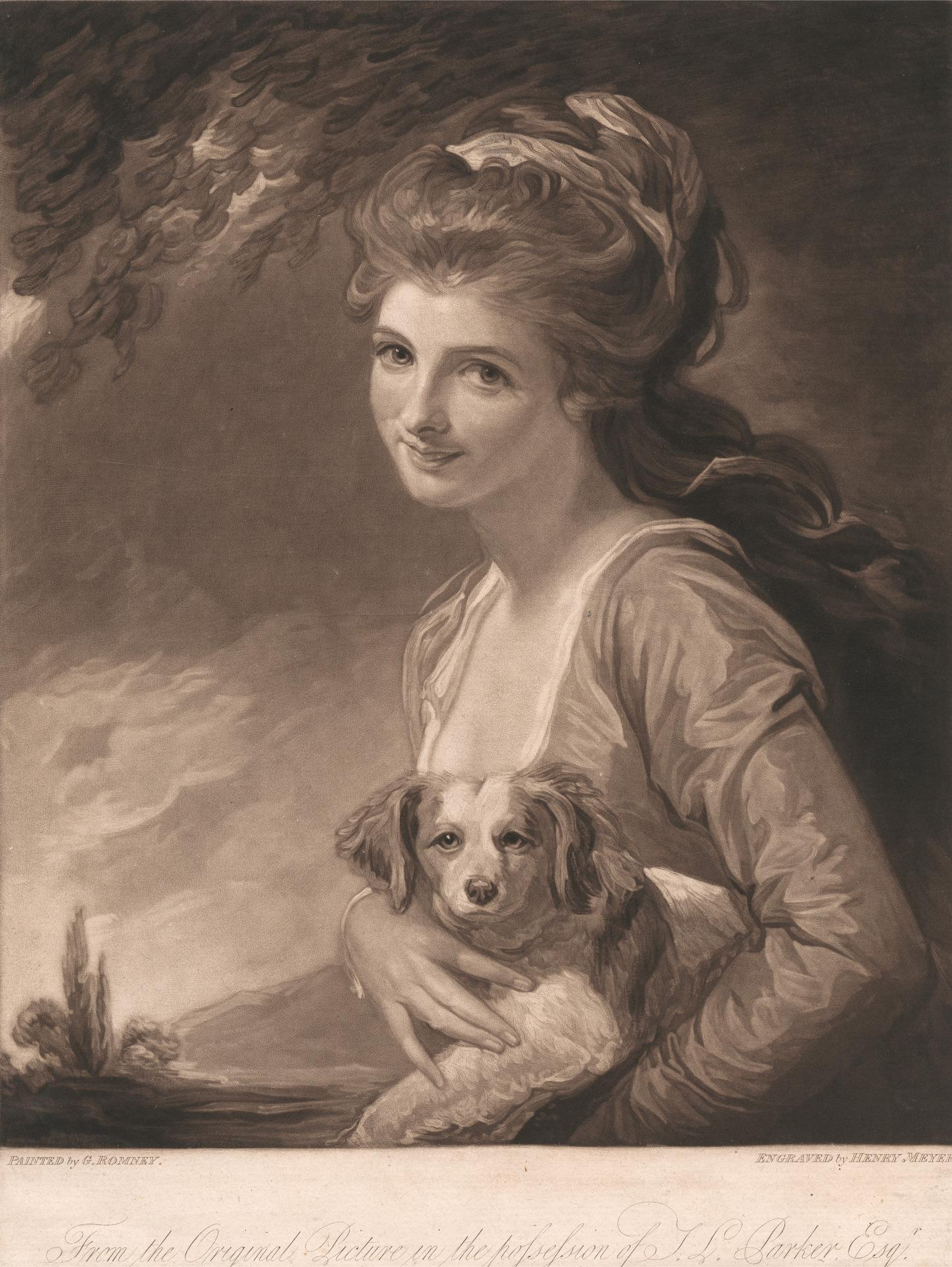
Emma, Lady Hamilton as Nature, print by Henry Hoppner Meyer after the painting by George Romney, "posture" size.

Because the pits in the plate are not deep, only a small number of top-quality impressions (copies) can be printed before the quality of the tone starts to degrade as the pressure of the press begins to smooth them out. Perhaps only one or two hundred really good impressions can be taken, although plates were often "refreshed" by further rocker work. In 1832 a writer in Arnold's Library noted:

...the uncertainty as to the number of impressions this kind of engraving will afford—some plates failing after fifty or even a less number are printed; from two to three hundred are the most that can be taken off, and then it is often necessary to refresh the ground and restore the lights during the progress of the printing."

However, if performed by the printer or the artist's apprentice, refreshing the plate was often done to a lower standard. Bamber Gascoigne said of an example he illustrated with before and after details "the dark tones have been clumsily renewed with the roulette; the result is brutal in close-up but will seem adequate when the whole print is viewed at a normal distance".

Standard sizes used in England were known× as "royal", 24 × 19 in., "large", 18 × 24 in., "posture", 14 × 10 in., and "small", 6 × 4 in, and ready-made frames and albums could be bought to fit these.

== Detailed technique ==
Plates can be mechanically roughened; one way is to rub fine metal filings over the surface with a piece of glass; the finer the filings, the smaller the grain of the surface. Special roughening tools called 'rockers' have been in use since at least the eighteenth century. The method commonly in use today is to use a steel rocker approximately five inches wide, which has between 45 and 120 teeth per inch on the face of a blade in the shape of a shallow arc, with a wooden handle projecting upwards in a T-shape. Rocked steadily from side to side at the correct angle, the rocker will proceed forward creating burrs in the surface of the copper. The plate is then moved – either rotated by a set number of degrees or through 90 degrees according to preference – and then rocked in another pass. This is repeated until the plate is roughened evenly and will print a completely solid tone of black.

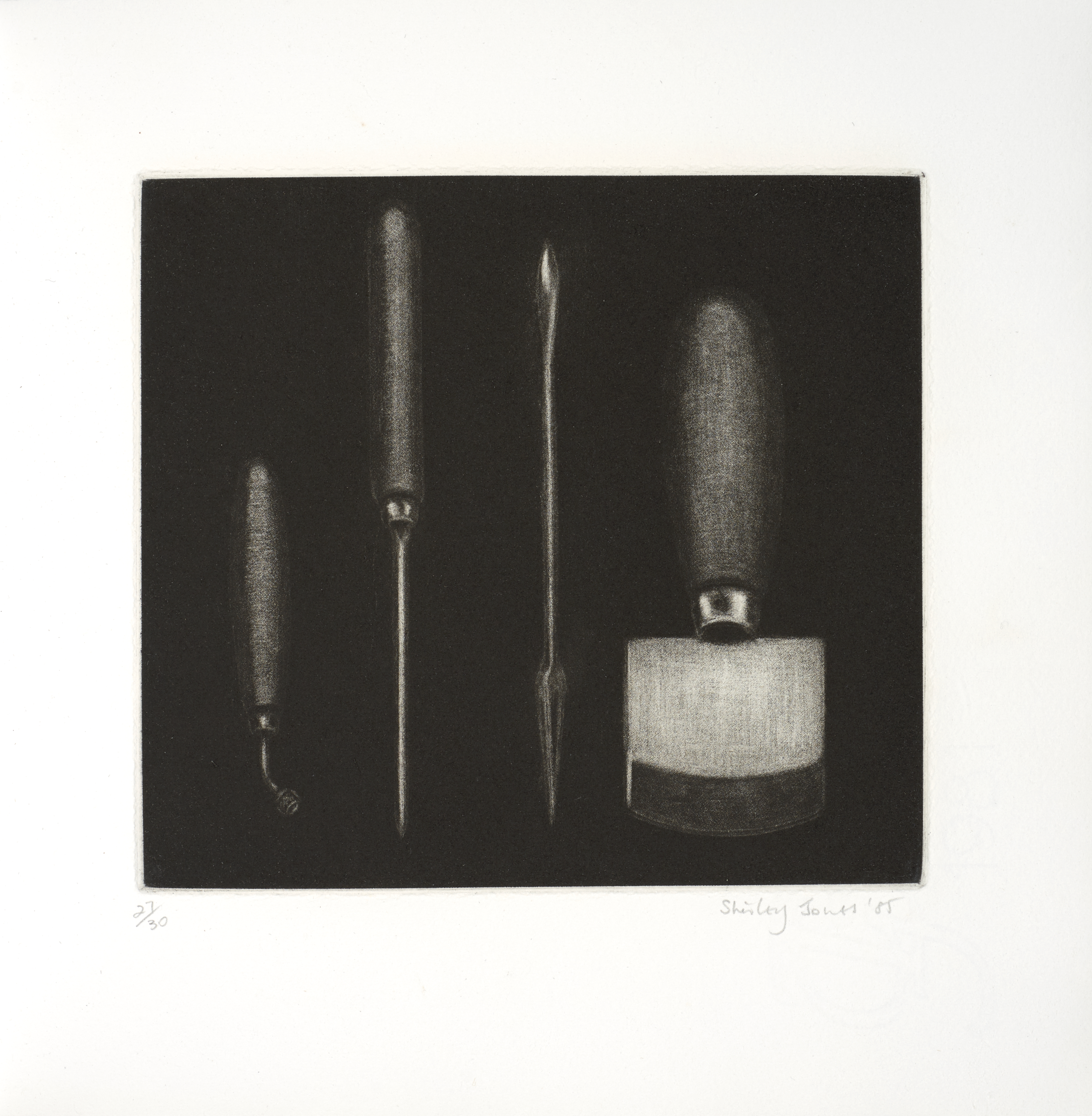
A mezzotint of mezzotint tools. Shirley Jones, A Dark Side of the Sun (1986)

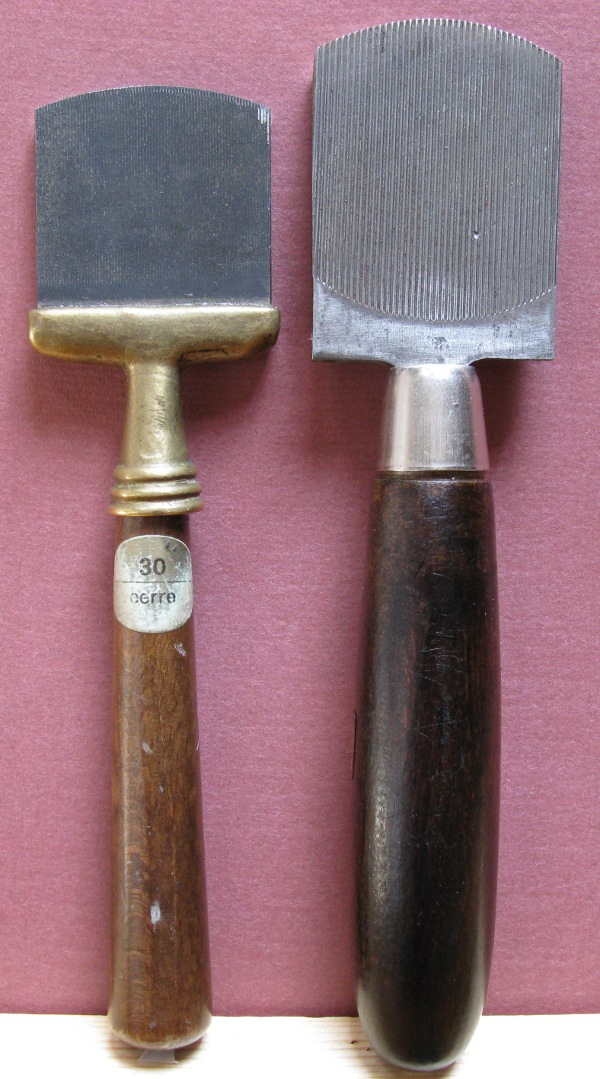
Two sizes of rocker

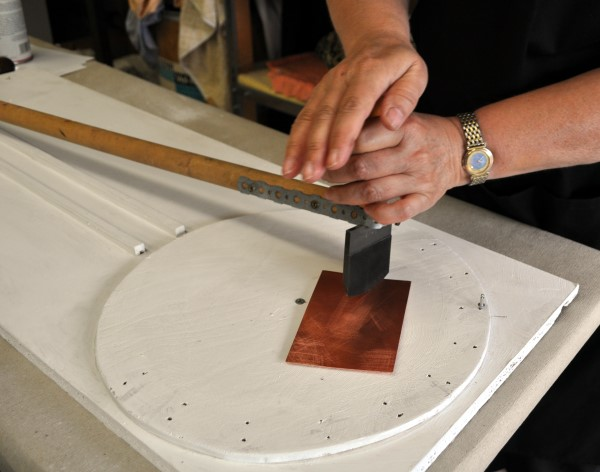
Using the rocker

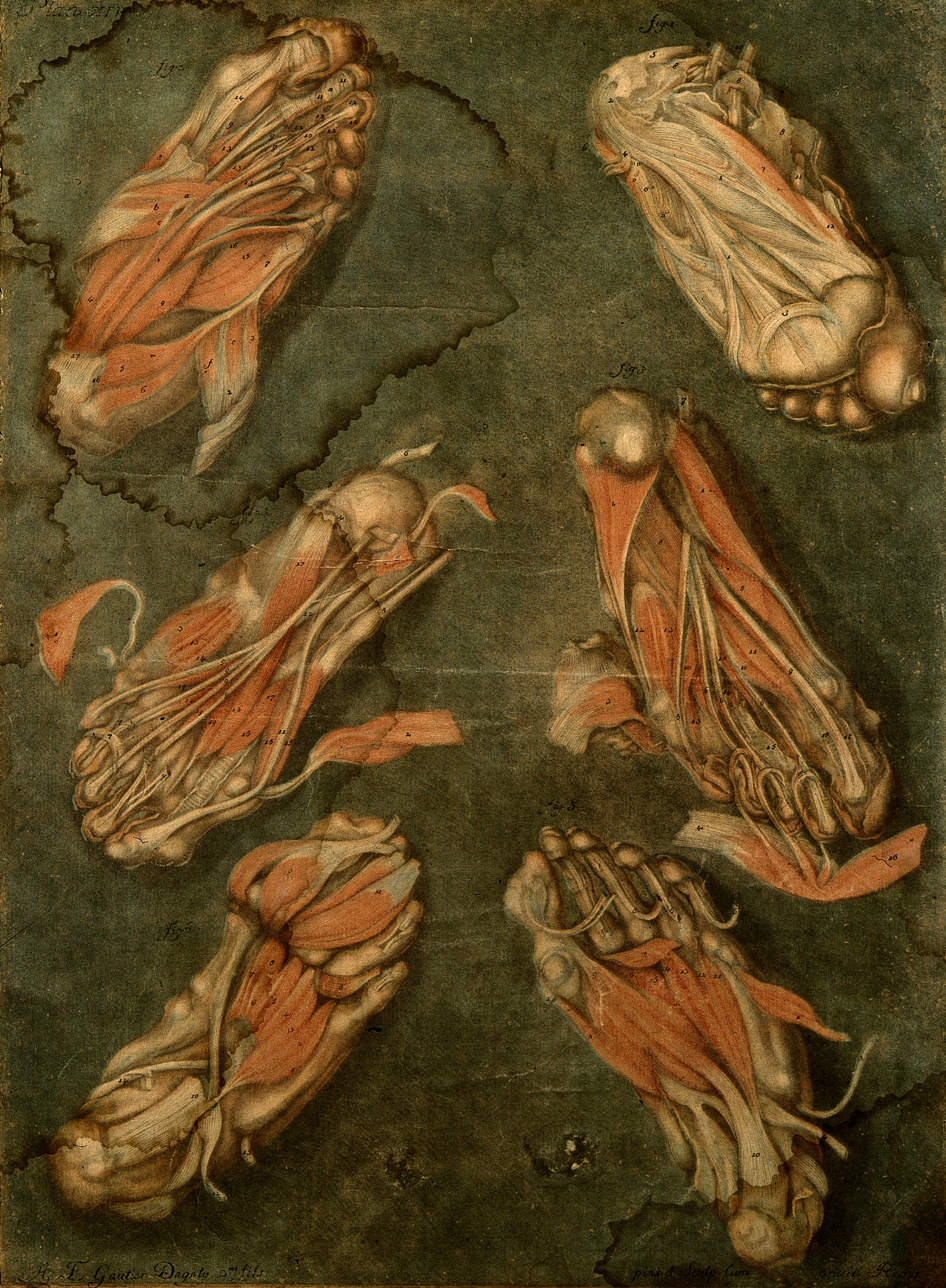
Muscles of the sole of the foot, Colour mezzotint by A.E. Gautier d'Agoty (son of Jacques Fabien Gautier d'Agoty), 1773

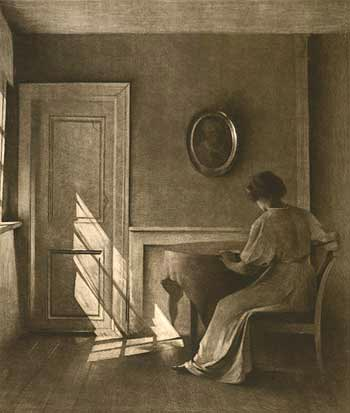
Sunshine V, Peter Ilsted

== Mezzotint engravers by date of birth ==
- Ludwig von Siegen – inventor
- Prince Rupert of the Rhine
- Wallerant Vaillant (1623–1677, the first professional mezzotinter)
- John Smith (c. 1652 – c. 1742)
- Jan van der Vaart (c. 1650 – 1727, Dutchman working in England)
- Jacob Christoph Le Blon (1667–1741, German, developed colour printing, using different plates)
- Bernhard Vogel (1683–1737)
- George White (c. 1684 – 1732)
- Jacques Fabien Gautier d'Agoty (1716–1785, French, developed a four-colour mezzotint process)
- Richard Houston (1721?–1775)
- James MacArdell (1729?–1765, Irish)
- Edward Fisher (1730?–1785?, Irish)
- Johann Jacob Ridinger (1736–1784), youngest son of Johann Elias Ridinger, who also worked in mezzotint
- David Martin (1737–1797, Scottish)
- William Pether (c. 1738–1821)
- Valentine Green (1739–1813)
- John Dixon (about 1740–1811)
- Richard Earlom (1743–1822)
- William Dickinson (1746–1823)
- John Raphael Smith (1751–1812)
- John Jones (c. 1755–1797)
- Joseph Grozer (1755–1799)
- John Young (1755–1825)
- William Doughty (1757–1782)
- James Walker (c. 1760 – c. 1823, British, moved to Russia)
- Charles Howard Hodges (1764–1837, English, moved to Amsterdam)
- William Say (1764–1834)
- Charles Turner (1774–1857)
- John Martin (1789–1854)
- James Bromley (1800–1838)
- John Sartain (1808–1897, English pioneer of the technique in America)
- Alexander Hay Ritchie (1822–1895, Scottish, moved to US)
- Richard Josey (1840–1906), engraver of James McNeill Whistler's Whistler's Mother
- Sir Frank Short (1857–1945)
- Peter Ilsted (1861–1933, Danish)
- T. F. Simon (1877–1942)
- M. C. Escher (1898–1972)
- Lynd Ward (1905-1985)
- Yozo Hamaguchi (1909–2000)
- Mario Avati (1921–2009)
- Leonard Marchant (1929–2000)
- Robert Kipniss (b. 1931)
- Shirley Jones (b. 1934)
- Toru Iwaya (b. 1936)
- Vija Celmins (b. 1938)
- Holly Downing (b. 1948)
- Carol Wax (b. 1953)

== General and cited references ==
- Alexander, David (1996). "Mezzotint". In Turner, Jane (ed.). The Dictionary of Art. Vol. 21. New York: Grove's Dictionaries. pp. 414–418. ISBN 9781884446009 – via the Internet Archive.
- Barker, Elizabeth E. . “The Printed Image in the West: Mezzotint”, 2003, Heilbrunn Timeline of Art History. New York: The Metropolitan Museum of Art, online
- D'Oench, Ellen Gates, Copper into Gold: Prints by John Raphael Smith, 1999, Yale University Press, ISBN 9780300076301
- Gascoigne, Bamber. How to Identify Prints: A Complete Guide to Manual and Mechanical Processes from Woodcut to Inkjet, 1986 (2nd Edition, 2004), Thames & Hudson, ISBN 050023454X
- Griffiths, Antony, ed. (1996a), Landmarks in Print Collecting: Connoisseurs and Donors at the British Museum since 1753, 1996, British Museum Press, ISBN 0714126098
- Griffiths, Antony (1996b), Prints and Printmaking: an Introduction to the History and Techniques, 2nd ed., British Museum Press, ISBN 071412608X, 83 US edition online
- Mayor, Hyatt A., Prints and People, Metropolitan Museum of Art/Princeton, 1971, no page numbers, by illustration, online as PDF, ISBN 0691003262
- Robinson, Gerald Philip (1911). "Mezzotint" . In Chisholm, Hugh (ed.). Encyclopædia Britannica. Vol. 18 (11th ed.). Cambridge University Press. pp. 351–353. This includes a detailed description of mezzotint history and methods.
