= Portrait of Marie Antoinette (Gautier-Dagoty) =

Painting by Jean-Baptiste André Gautier-Dagoty

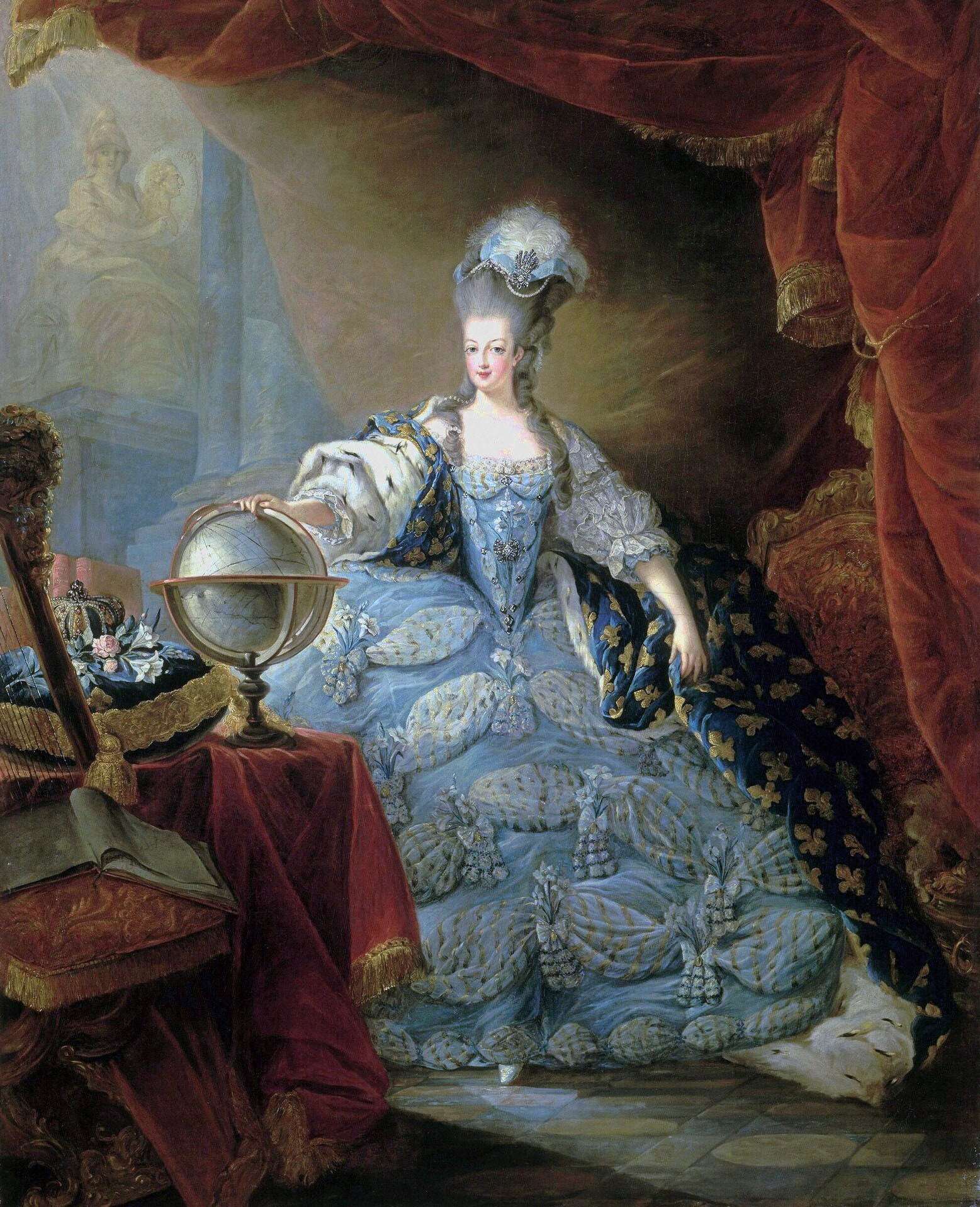
- Artist: Jean-Baptiste André Gautier-Dagoty
- Year: 1775
- Type: Oil on canvas, portrait painting
- Dimensions: 160 cm × 128 cm (63 in × 50 in)
- Location: Palace of Versailles

Portrait of Marie Antoinette is a 1775 portrait painting by the French artist Jean-Baptiste André Gautier-Dagoty. It depicts the Austrian-born Marie Antoinette, the wife of Louis XVI. The work was intended as a gift for her mother Maria Theresa of Austria. She is shown at full-length wearing an ermine-lined cloak featuring the fleur-de-lis, the heraldic symbol of the Kingdom of France.

The couple had been married in 1770, and she became queen consort when her husband succeeded Louis XVIII in 1874. . Marie Antoinette was frequently portrayed during her early years in France, but disliked her depictions. She came to prefer the paintings of Élisabeth Vigée Le Brun in the following years. Today the picture is in the collection of the Palace of Versailles having been acquired in 1954.

== Bibliography ==
- Moyle, Franny. Mrs Kauffman and Madame Le Brun: The Entwined Lives of Two Great Eighteenth-Century Women Artists. Bloomsbury Publishing, 2025
