= Leonard Marchant =

British painter and printmaker (1929–2000)

Leonard Marchant RE (23 October 1929 – 9 January 2000) was a painter and printmaker, particularly admired as a master of the mezzotint.

== Early life ==
Marchant was born on 23 October 1929, at Cape Town, the second son of Kathleen (née Cunningham) and Henry Marchant. His father died while on active service in the Second World War, when Marchant was 15; and he and his siblings were brought up by his devout Catholic mother, grandmother and aunts.

As a teenager he taught himself to paint; and in 1950, at the age of 19, was given a solo exhibition at the Argus Gallery in Cape Town, South Africa.

In 1950, Marchant worked his passage on a merchant ship and arrived in London with little money and no contacts. He was not eligible for a grant to study in the UK. He telephoned Jacob Epstein out of the blue and visited him with a portfolio of drawings and paintings. Epstein was encouraging and gave him a letter of recommendation to the British Council, which provided a grant to allow him to study for three months at the Saint Martin's School of Art.

In London Marchant met and married Teressa Trapler. Forced by financial and political constraints to return to South Africa, they finally moved permanently to the UK three years later, in 1956; and in 1959 Marchant received a grant to study full time at the Central School of Arts and Crafts.

== Career ==
During his studies at the Central School for Arts and Crafts, Marchant saw the mezzotints of Yōzō Hamaguchi, a Japanese artist then living in Paris. During this time, Marchant discovered a mezzotint rocker and rocking pole in a cupboard at the school. “No one knew how to do it any longer so I had to teach myself," he later wrote, “it was an incredibly laborious process. What really appealed to me was the superb richness of the tone”.

Although Marchant continued to paint throughout his life, he was best known for his mezzotints. “With his mezzotints, he touched greatness… Marchant was a master, his needle scratched in the darkness; a candle, a bowl, a cup and saucer gleamed forth.” Liese Van Der Watt said that “Marchant is credited with the revival of this old craft in the (19)60s, especially in Britain.” and "the paintings show the same narrow repetition of a single class of subject, as if the artist's concern is more with technique and medium and with the objects that are portrayed. But something else has crept into these oils - a sense of purposeful naivety, of magic realism that reminds one vaguely and unexpectedly of the works of Frida Kahlo".

In 1963, Marchant joined the staff of the Central School of Arts and Crafts in the Fine Art Etching department where he stayed until 1983. In later years he travelled to other art schools including Royal, Slade, Chelsea, Morley and Winchester, to demonstrate the mezzotint process and illustrate this with his own work.

In 1986, Marchant was elected a fellow of the Royal Society of Painter-Printmakers, with whom he exhibited regularly.

== Later life ==
After retiring from teaching, Marchant and his wife moved to Shropshire, where he continued to work both on mezzotints and painting. His final solo show was held at the London Bankside Gallery in 1998.

== Awards ==
- 1970 – Stet prize, Florence Biennale.
- 1975 – Grocers Fellowship, British School at Rome, Rome.
- 1986 – Christie's Contemporary Art Prize – Best print in Royal Society of Painters Etchers and Engravers Exhibition.
- 1987 - CCA Galleries, PLC Award.
- 1998 – Purcell Paper Prize, National Print Exchange, Mall Gallery.

== Collections ==
- Bowdoin College Museum of Art
- British Council
- Davison Art Center, Wesleyan University
- Museum Folkwang, Essen
- South African National Gallery
- University of the Arts London
- University of Michigan Museum of Art
- Victoria and Albert Museum, London

== Solo exhibitions ==
- 1950 − Argus Gallery, Cape Town, South Africa
- 1998 − Retrospective 1948–1998, Bankside Gallery, London
