= Jacques Fabien Gautier d'Agoty =

French painter

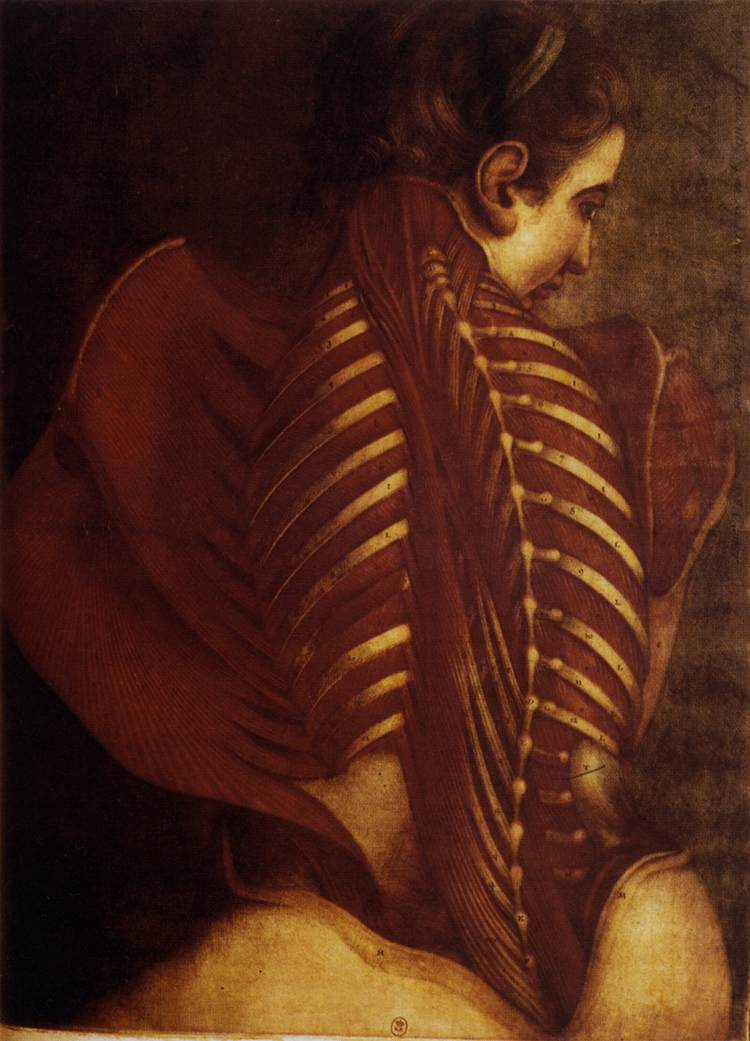
Dissection of a woman's back

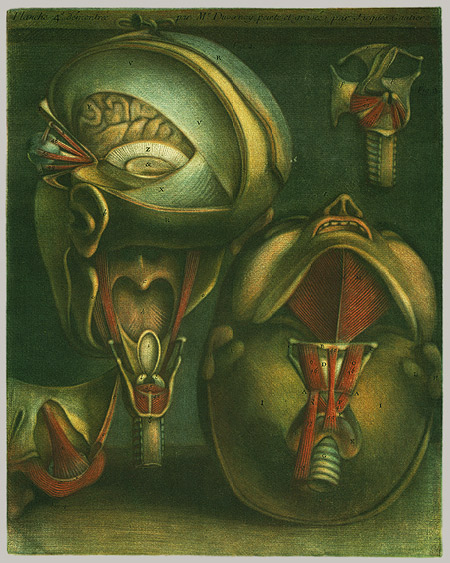
Muscles of the head

Jacques Fabien Gautier d'Agoty (6 September 1711, Marseille–25 January 1786, Paris) was a French anatomist, painter and printmaker.

== Life and work ==
His studies began as a pupil of the painter and engraver Jacob Christoph Le Blon, the inventor of the first engraving and printing process that involved the use of colors (blue, yellow and red). D'Agoty claimed that he proposed an improved method, using black, but was rebuffed by Le Blon. In any event, it was d'Agoty and his sons who popularized the process of color engraving in France. For many years, they published a journal with color illustrations.

He was elected a member of the Académie des Sciences, Arts et Belles-Lettres de Dijon. He is best remembered for collaborating with the physician and anatomist, Guichard Joseph Duverney to produce albums of anatomical charts: the Myologie complete en couleur et grandeur naturelle (1746). The tendons and veins were described as standing out in "horrible precision".

Together with his sons, Jean-Baptiste, Honoré-Louis, Jean-Fabien, Édouard and Arnauld-Éloi, he produced a "French Gallery" and a "Universal Gallery" of portraits of famous men and women, which were published in 1770 and 1772.
