= Mount Vernon City School District (New York) =

School district in the U.S. state of New York

- Emblem of Mount Vernon City School District

Location
- Mount Vernon, New York United States
- Coordinates: 40.91417°N 73.83056°W

District information
- Type: Public School District
- Motto: Home of the Knights
- President: Dr. Donna Marable
- Vice-president: Randolf Scott
- Superintendent: Dr. Demario A. Strickland
- Asst. superintendent(s): Dr. Jamal Doggett, LaJuan White, Joe Lin
- Schools: 13 School Buildings- One 9th-12th Grade High School, Two Pre-K-8th Grade Schools, Four Pre-K-6th Grade Schools & Two 7th-12th Grade Schools
- Budget: $275.5 million

Students and staff
- Students: 6,000+
- District mascot: Knights
- Colors: Gold and Maroon

Other information
- Website: www.mtvernoncsd.org

The Mount Vernon City School District (MVCSD) is a public school district located in Mount Vernon, New York. Consisting of over 11 Pre-K through 8th grade neighborhood schools and two high schools, the district serves over 8,000 students from the City of Mount Vernon.

In August 2015 the Mount Vernon Board of Trustees appointed Dr. Kenneth R. Hamilton as the Superintendent of Schools and with him a knew district-level administrative team committed to improving the school system and educational outcomes for the district's students.

In March 2016, the District put forward a $108 million bond referendum tied to a 20/20 Vision for Academic Excellence. The bond referendum was approved by an overwhelming majority of district voters. The bond not only focused on facility upgrades and improvements, but was designed around an academic vision to convert the district's K-6 elementary schools to Pre-K through 8th grade neighborhood schools. The bond would also allow students choose between three high schools.

It would also create the Mount Vernon STEAM Academy, A 9th-12th grade building, house in the former A.B. Davis Middle School, that would focus on Science, Technology, Arts, Engineering and Math Academy.

Additionally, the bond would allow Nellie A. Thornton High School to become the permanent home of the district's popular Performing and Visual Arts Magnet Program for students in 6th through 12th grades.

Mount Vernon High School would also undergo a renaissance under the approved bond referendum. The 20/20 Vision called for restoration of Mount Vernon High School's storied Career and Technical Education Program and the implementation of an International Baccalaureate program.

== History ==
In 2016 The Journal News editorial board posted an article favoring the Mount Vernon school bond.

== Schools in Good Standing ==
In the Spring of 2019 the Mount Vernon City School District received notification from the New York State Education Department that 14 of the district's schools were now designated as Schools in Good Standing.

The Education Department defines a “school in good standing” as one “which has not been identified as a school in need of improvement, requiring corrective action, planning for restructuring, or requiring academic progress, or as a school under registration review.”

== Taxes ==
The Mount Vernon City School District have been committed to improving the school system and being responsible stewards of the public monies in the operation of the district. Since the 2016-2017 budget, the District Administration has presented and the Board of Trustees adopted, 4 budgets (2016-2017, 2017–2018 & 2019-2020) that would result in a ===0% increase on the tax levy===. The 2018-2019 budget reflected a .89% increase on the tax levy.

== List of current schools ==
There are sixteen public schools in the district as follows:

School	Type
Mount Vernon STEAM Academy	7th-12th Grade
Edward Williams	Elementary
Graham	Pre-K-8th Grade
Grimes	Elementary
Hamilton	Elementary
Lincoln	K-8th Grade
Nelson Mandela/Dr. Hosea Zollicoffer School	Elementary
Rebecca Turner Academy	Elementary
Benjamin Turner Academy	K-8th Grade
Mount Vernon High School	High School
Denzel Washington School of the Arts	7th-12th Grade
Pennington	Pre-K-8th Grade
Martin H. Traphagen	Elementary

== Notable alumni ==
- E. B. White, writer
- Ken Singleton, Major League Baseball player
- Carol Wax, print maker
- Art Carney, actor
- Dick Clark, television personality
- Janet DiFiore, Chief Judge of New York State Court of Appeals
- George Latimer, Westchester County Executive
- Al B. Sure!, singer
- Denzel Washington, actor
- Heavy D, rapper and actor
