= Constantin Xenakis =

Greek artist (1931–2020)

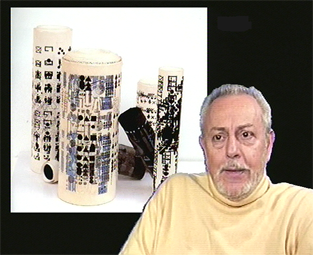
Constantin Xenakis 1995

Constantin Xenakis (Greek: Κωνσταντίνος Ξενάκης; 28 December 1931 – 6 June 2020) was a Greek artist based in France. His work often includes written script, in particular the Hebrew alphabet. symbols and codes of everyday life, traffic signs, alchemy, the zodiac, mathematical and chemical symbols, Egyptian hieroglyphics, letters from the Greek, Phoenician and Arabic alphabets.

== Life ==
Xenakis was born in Cairo, Egypt, on 28 December 1931. He lived mainly in Paris since 1955. In 1976–77 he collaborated with the composer Jean-Yves Bosseur on the work Ornigrammes.

He was made a Chevalier de l' Ordre des Arts et des Lettres in 1986. In 1996 he was awarded the Prix Delmas by the Institut de France, at the recommendation of the French Academy of Fine Arts. The Constantin Xenakis Room in the Fameck community centre was opened in 1991. In 1998 he was given an "Award of Appreciation" at the 24th Olympiad by the National Museum of Contemporary Art, Korea.

His work is held in the National Gallery of Greece and the Macedonian Museum of Contemporary Art.

In May 2022 the contemporary art museum "Constantin Xenakis" was opened in Serres Greece.

He died in Athens on 5 June 2020, aged 88.

== Works ==
- 1969: "EK-STASIS", spectacle with electrically kinetic sculptures by Constantin Xenakis, electronic music by Joanna Bruzdowicz, mime by Jaroszewics and Marceau.
- 1982: "La grande journée", co-production C.F.D.T.-Antenne 2, text J.P. Faye, music J.V. Bosseur, sets C. Xenakis, choreography Pomares
- 1985: Creation of relief and ceramic semiotic routes (670 m²) for the sewage pumping station of the town of Crosne, France. Architect Monique Labbe.

== Selected solo exhibitions ==
- 1969: "Espace a Reflexion", Xenakis, Gette, Sodertalje Konsthall, Sweden, One Man Show, Environment, Catalogue in Swedish, texts, Yona Friedman, Marcel Marceau, Eje Hogestatt, G. Xenakis.
- 1970: "Constantin Xenakis", Malmö Museum, Sweden, One Man Show, Environment-Action, Catalogue in Swedish and in French, text, C. Xenakis.
- 1971: "Studio fur Moderne Kunst", Goethe Institut, Athens, One Man Show, Environment-Action.
- 1971: "RA / Reflexion", Action, Studio fur Moderne Kunst, Goethe Institut, Athens, no. 1, Magazine-Catalogue in Greek, in French and in German, Redacteur en Chef, C. Xenakis, texts, Yona Friedman, Marcel Marceau, Heinz Ohff, Christos Joachimides.
- 1974: Galerija Studentskog Centra, Zagreb, One Man Show, Action.
- 1976: "Centre d' Art et Communication", Vaduz (Liechtenstein), One Man Show, Painting.
- 1978: Centre d' Art et Communication, Vaduz (Liechtenstein), One Man Show, Painting.
- 1981: "Constantin Xenakis : 15 Ans d'Art Sémiotique", Centre Culturel de Mont -Saint-Aignan (France), One Man Show, Environment, Painting, Catalogue, texts, Pierre Restany, "L' homme est l' oeuvre", Bernard Heidsieck, " C. Xenakis, ou notre infirmier-benedictin".
- 1983: "Constantin Xenakis: Itineraire d' un Peintre", Galerie Municipale, Ville de Vitry-sur-Seine (France), One Man Show, Environment, Painting, Objects, Catalogue, texts, Pierre Restany, "L' homme est l' oeuvre", Raoul-Jean Moulin, " Xenakis et le brouillage des codes ", Gerard Xuriguera, "C. Xenakis ", preface, Jean Collet, " C. Xenakis ".
- 1985: "Constantin Xenakis", Walker Hill Art Center, Seoul, One Man Show, Painting, Photography, Catalogue in Korean and in French, Texts, Kyung-Sung Lee, Constantin Xenakis.
- 1985: "Constantin Xenakis", Institut Franco-Japonais, Tokyo, One Man Show, Painting, Photography, Catalogue in Japanese and in French, Text, Constantin Xenakis.
- 1985: "Constantin Xenakis", Musee d' Art Moderne de la ville de Taipei, One Man Show, Painting, Photography, Catalogue in Chinese and in French, Text, Martha Su Fu, Constantin Xenakis, M. Deverge.
- 1991: "7e Festival du Film Arabe de Fameck. Inauguration de l' Espace" C. Xenakis, Centre Social, Fameck, (France), One Man Show, Painting, Photography, Catalogue, texts, Gino Ceppetelli, Constantin Xenakis.
- 1996: "Constantin Xenakis, Retrospective 1958-1996 : The return of the artist", Musee des Beaux Arts, Alexandria, Egypt, One Man Show, Painting, Objects, Catalogue in Greek, Arabian and French, Texts, Chrysantos Christou, "Constantin Xenakis", Marcel Marceau, Pierre Restany, " L' homme est l' oeuvre ", Michel Butor, " Dans la nouvelle bibliothèque d' Alexandrie pour C. Xenakis ", Jean-Clarence Lambert, " Le scribe ", F. Arrabal, preface, Adamantios Pepelassis, Edition, Foundation for Hellenic Culture.
- 1997: "Constantin Xenakis, Retrospective 1958-1996 : The return of the artist", Hanager Arts Center, Cairo, Egypt, One Man Show, Painting, Objects.
- 1997: Le Livre de la Vie, Chapitre B: Alexandre le Grand et Moi, de Constantin Xenakis (The Book of Life, Chapter 2 : Alexander the Great and me, by Constantin Xenakis), Alatza Imaret, Thessaloniki, One Man Show, Installation-Environment, Catalogue in Greek and in French, Texts Thalia Stefanidou, "Septembre 1997", Constantin Xenakis, "Le livre de la vie", Jean Pierre Faye, " Livre de vie C. Xenakis ", Miche Butor, " Chant des Ptolemees pour C. Xenakis ", Edition part of the programme of events for " Thessaloniki Cultural Capital of Europe 1997 ".
- 1998: "9e Festival du Film Arabe de Fameck", Cite Sociale de Fameck, (France), One Man Show, Painting, Painting.
- 2003: "Constantin Xenakis. Le livre de la vie Ch. C. Les trois KKK", Macedonian Museum of Contemporary Art, Thessaloniki, Greece
- 2003: "Constantin Xenakis. Works 1980-2001", State Museum of Contemporary Art, Costakis Collection, Thessaloniki, Greece
- 2005: Lola Nikolaou Art Gallery in Macedonian Museum of Contemporary Art, Thessaloniki, Greece
- 2005: "Constantin Xenakis, Parcours d’un peintre 1966-2004", Centre Noroit Arras, France.
- 2005: "Constantin Xenakis", Fundació Jaume II el Just. Reial Monastir de Santa Maria de la Valldigna, generalitat Valenciana conselleria de Cultura, Spain.
- 2006: "Le code de la Route" Museum of Modern Greek Art, Rhodes, Greece.
- 2006: "Structures & Codes" Herakleidon Museum, Athens.

== See also ==
- List of concrete and visual poets
