= Helen Marcus =

American photographer (1925–2023)

- Born: October 28, 1925
- Died: October 1, 2023 (aged 97); New York, New York
- Education: Smith College
- Website: helenmarcus.com

Helen Mae Marcus (October 28, 1925 – October 1, 2023) was an American photographer.

== Early life and education ==
Marcus was born in 1925 to Augusta (Hittleman) Marcus, a Russian immigrant, and Joseph Marcus, a shoe store owner. She completed her education at A.B. Davis High School, Mount Vernon, New York, and later obtained a bachelor's degree in theater and economics from Smith College in 1946.

== Career ==
Marcus initially pursued a career in theater production, working with director Hal Prince, and later transitioned to television production at Goodson-Todman Productions from 1955 to 1974.

Her interest in photography, which began as a hobby, gradually became her professional focus. Her works were published in notable magazines including Time, Forbes, and Gourmet, and also featured in The New York Times. Her photographs are part of the permanent collections of the National Portrait Gallery and the International Center of Photography.

In the late 1970s, following the Cultural Revolution, Marcus was among the first Americans invited to China. She held teaching positions at the Parsons School of Design, the School of Visual Arts, and the Tisch School of the Arts at New York University. Trained under Philippe Halsman, a noted Life magazine photographer, Marcus specialized in portrait photography, capturing figures such as Mary Higgins Clark, Norman Mailer, Tom Wolfe, Kitty Carlisle, Cliff Robertson, and Merv Griffin.

A notable assignment in her career was photographing author Toni Morrison in 1977. A photograph from this session was later used for a Swedish postage stamp commemorating Morrison's Nobel Prize in Literature in 1993.

Marcus was an advocate for photographers' rights, particularly in a field then dominated by men. She was instrumental in founding the New York chapter of the American Society of Magazine Photographers (later renamed the American Society of Media Photographers) in 1982. She served as its national president from 1985 to 1990. Additionally, from 1998 to 2007, she was president of the W. Eugene Smith Memorial Fund, a foundation supporting independent photographers.

She died at her home in Manhattan on October 1, 2023.
