= Anthony Devis =

English painter

Anthony Devis (18 March 1729 – 26 April 1816) was an English landscape painter, working especially in watercolor and oils and active in London.

Anthony Devis was born in Preston, Lancashire. His father, also called Anthony Devis, was a carpenter and town councillor in the town. Anthony junior was the elder of two sons of his father's second marriage, to Anne Blackburne. His father also had two sons by his first marriage, to Ellin Rauthmell, the elder of whom was the portrait painter Arthur Devis. Anthony Devis the younger did not marry.

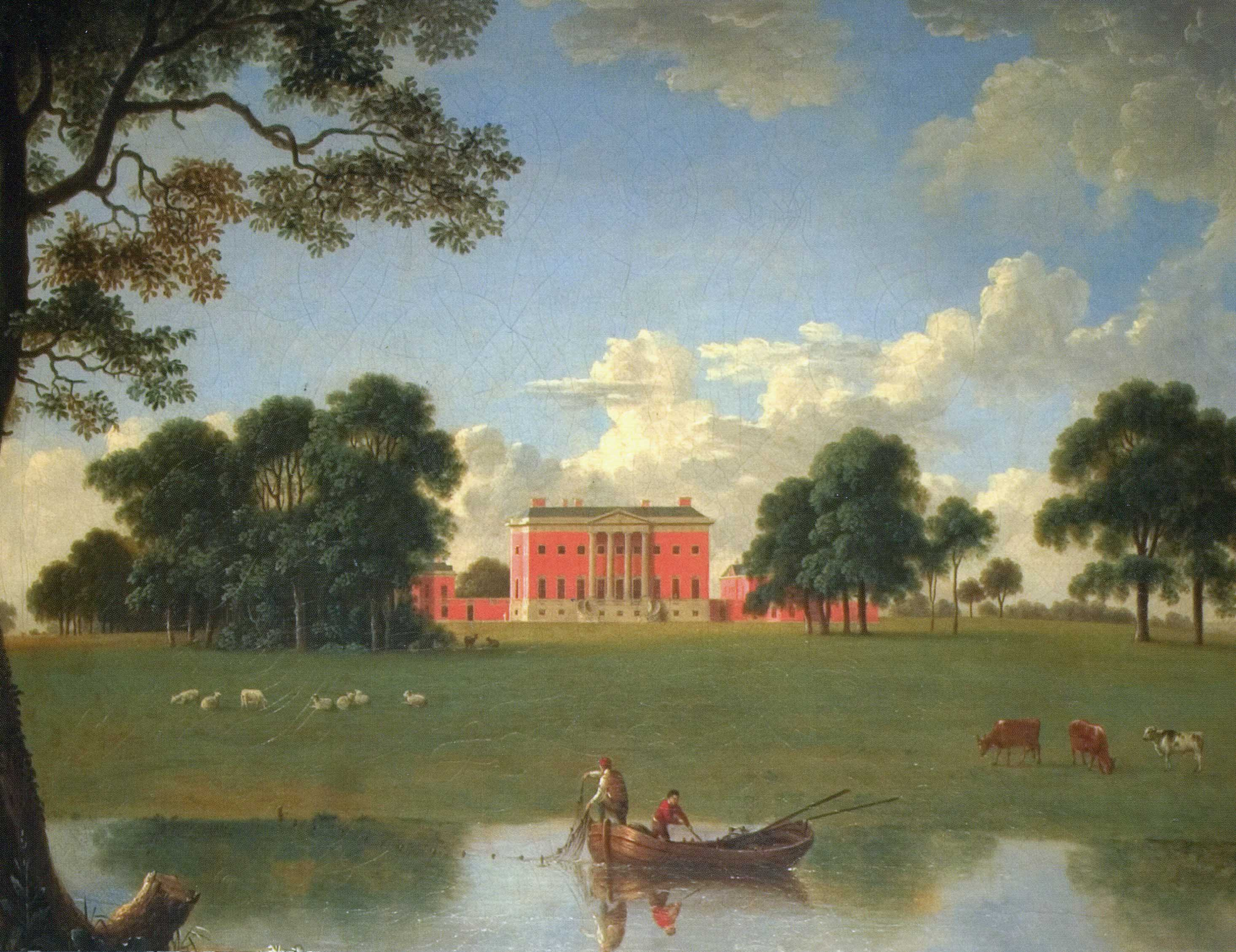
Tabley House from the Park c. 1770

== Early years ==
In the 1742 Preston Guild Roll the younger Anthony Devis was described as being a painter in London, but no work by him has been dated before 1760. Between 1760 and 1780 he produced many landscape paintings, mainly for landowners in Northern England. He exhibited paintings at the Free Society of Artists in 1761 and 1763, and at the Royal Academy in 1772 and 1781. Most of his paintings were topographical (of specific places), although later in his career he did produce some idealised views containing classical features.

== Frog Service ==
It so happened that this activity of Anthony Devis coincided with an interest of the Empress Catherine the Great of Russia, who constructed a palace as a staging post between St Petersburg and her summer residence at Tsarskoe Selo. The spot was surrounded by marshes, and the new Chesme Palace (named in honour of the Russian naval victory at the Battle of Chesma) was known also as La Grenouillère (the Frog Marsh), from the original Finnish name for the locality, Kekerekeksinen. Catherine commissioned a dinner and dessert service for her new palace from the English porcelain manufacturer Josiah Wedgwood. The service was for fifty people, and originally consisted of 944 pieces, decorated with 1,222 views.

The service was in "Queen's ware", Wedgwood's finest formulation of creamware or fine earthenware. Normally, large services for royalty were in porcelain, and an imperial order for a large earthenware service was a great coup. Its decoration was to feature hand-painted views of country houses from the British Isles in landscape settings and bore also a standard green frog device. Known subsequently as the Frog Service or "Green Frog Service", and produced in 1773-1774, it is regarded as one of the Wedgewood masterpieces and incidentally provides a valuable pictorial record of Britain at the period. The subjects include many of the finest British gardens of the day, ruined castles and abbeys, old manor houses, views over the Thames and numerous curiosities. A good number of these subjects were especially congenial to Catherine's interest in the Gothic revival. It is known that a number of the designs were drawn from Anthony Devis' work. Wedgwood lost a considerable amount in fulfilling the order, but the prestige compensated for this.

== Later life ==
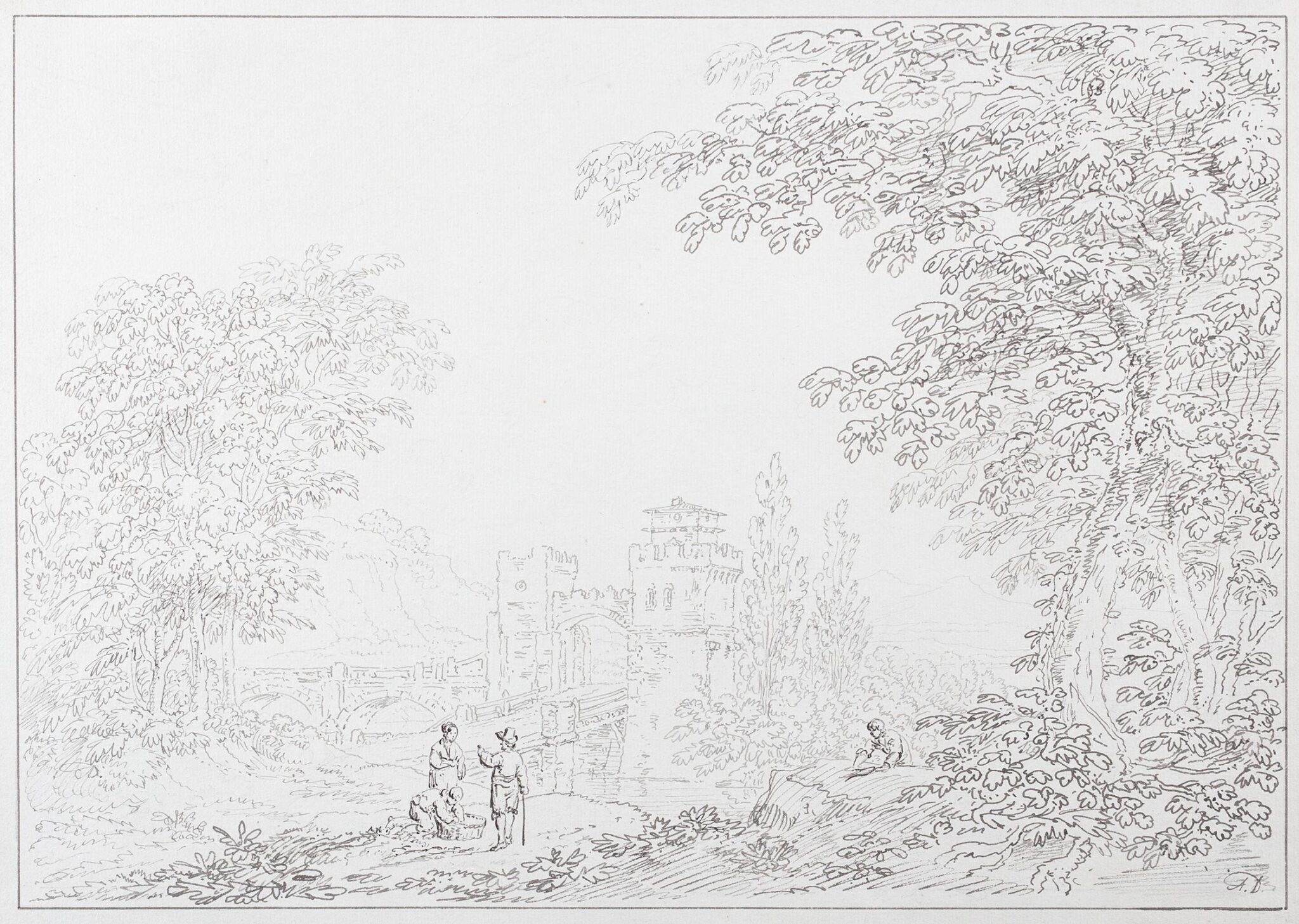
An Italian Capriccio (undated) in pen and ink

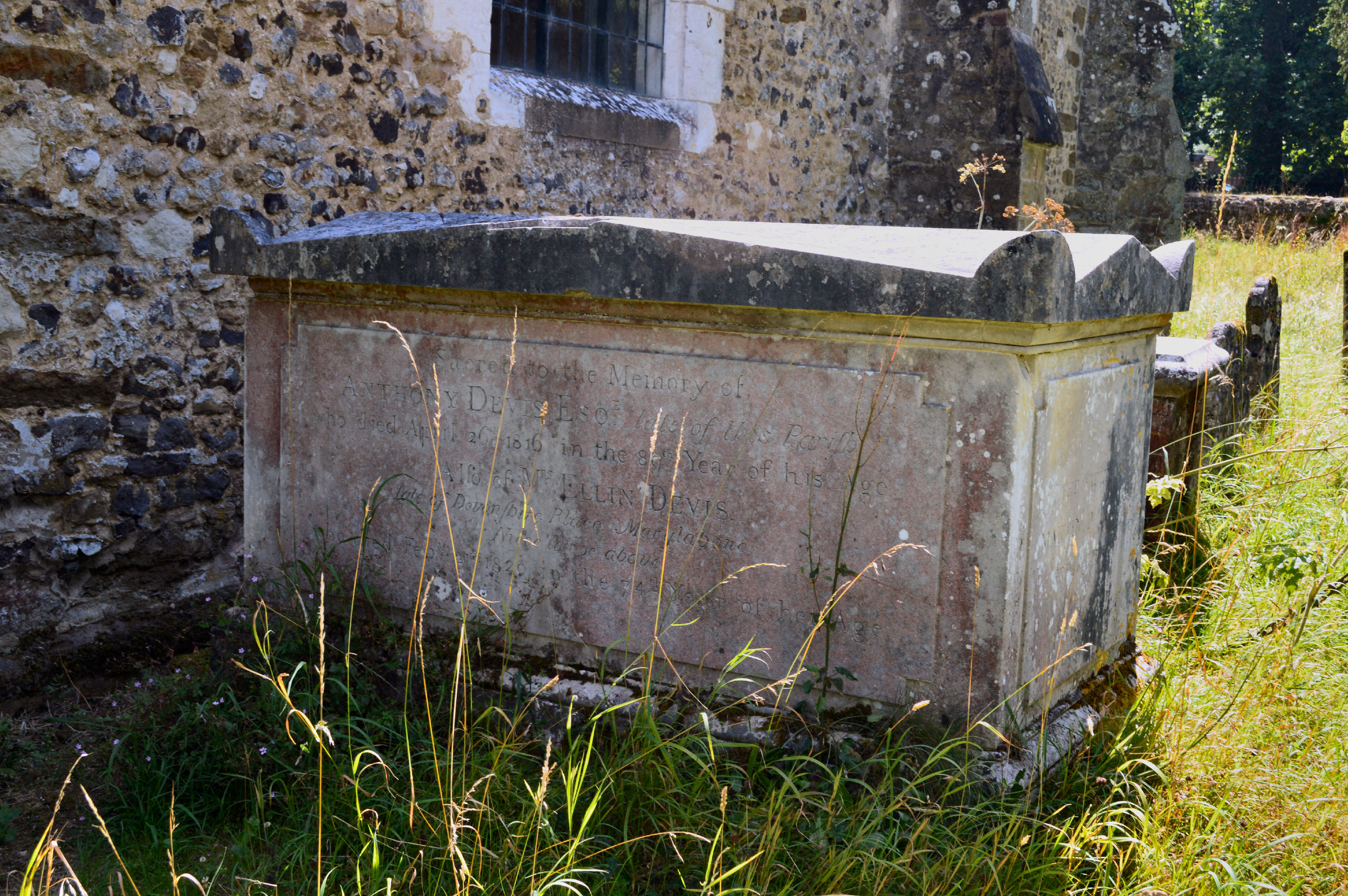
Vault in Albury old churchyard

In 1780 Anthony Devis retired to Albury House near Guildford, Surrey where he made a collection of paintings and curios. He also built a painting-room on a hill near Albury. Devis died in 1816 and was buried at Albury Old Church.
