= Mount Vernon High School (New York) =

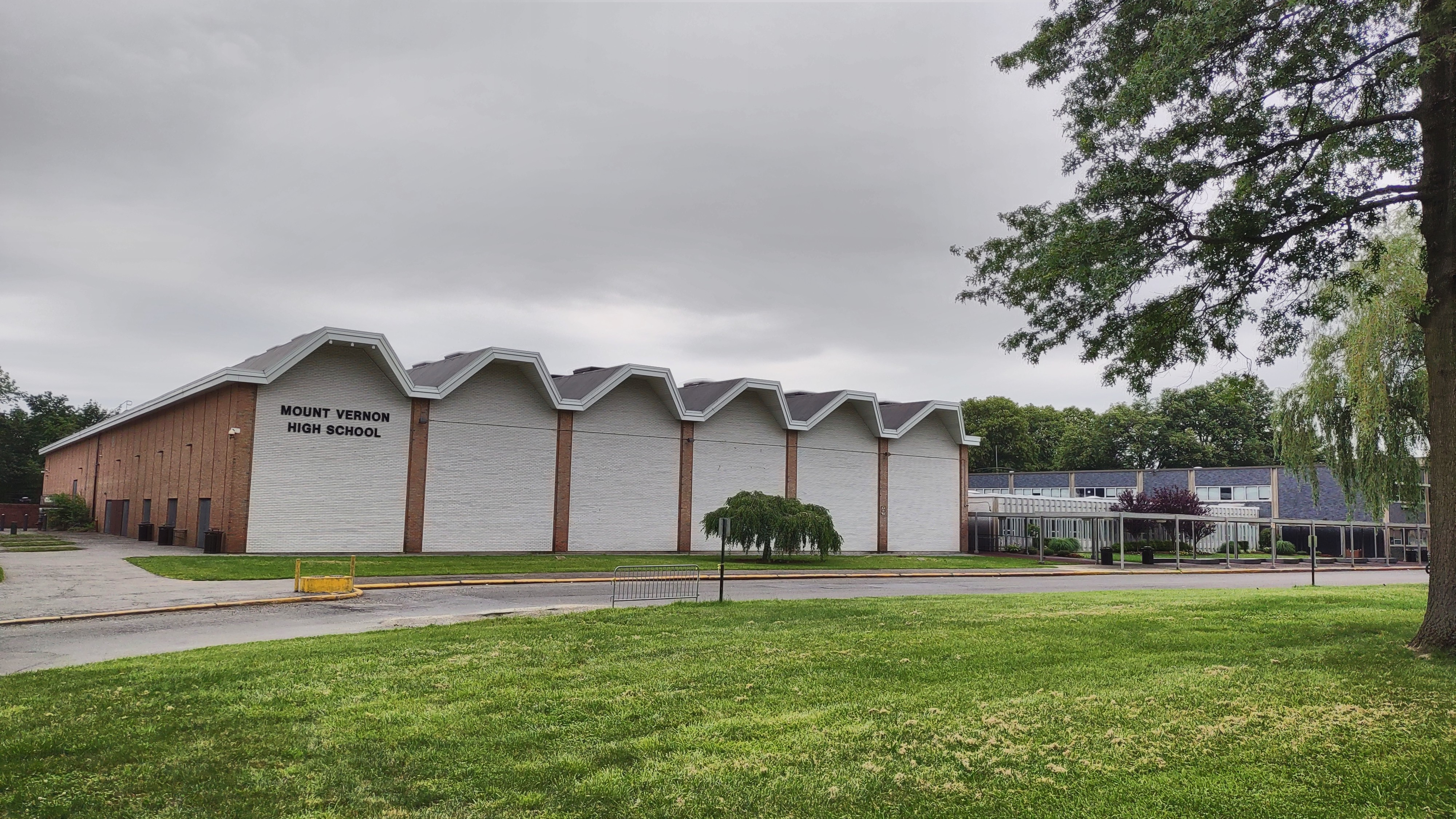

Location
- 100 California Road; Mount Vernon, New York 10552; United States; 40.925848°N 73.815077°W

Information
- Type: Public high school
- Motto: "Focusing on Excellence"
- Established: 1894 (current school created in 1964 as a merger of Edison Tech and A.B. Davis)
- School district: Mount Vernon City School District
- Teaching staff: 81.46 (on an FTE basis)
- Grades: 9-12
- Enrollment: 1,094 (2022–23)
- Student to teacher ratio: 13.43
- Colors: Maroon and gold
- Athletics: Section 1 (NYSPHSAA)
- Mascot: Knight
- Website: mvhs.mtvernoncsd.org

Mount Vernon High School (MVHS) is a public high school in the Chester Heights section of the City of Mount Vernon in Westchester County, New York, United States. It is part of the Mount Vernon City School District. The current Mount Vernon High School came into existence from the merger of the former A.B. Davis High School and Edison Tech in 1964.

== Sports ==
The school colors are maroon and gold, and teams are nicknamed the Knights. Sports include cheerleading, cross country, volleyball, track & field, baseball, softball, basketball, volleyball, tennis, wrestling, swimming, soccer, and football.

=== Basketball ===
New York State high school boys' basketball championships titles: 1991, 2000, 2004, 2006, 2007, 2011, 2012, 2017, 2022

== Notable alumni ==
- Garvin Alston, baseball player
- Rai Benjamin, Olympic hurdler
- Ralph Branca (1926–2016), Major League Baseball pitcher
- Art Carney, actor
- Dick Clark, television personality
- Heavy D, rapper and actor
- Janet DiFiore, Chief Judge of New York State Court of Appeals
- Walter Fairservis (1921–1994, class of 1939), archeologist at American Museum of Natural History and finder of "lost cities"; playwright and producer
- George Latimer, Westchester County Executive
- Helen Marcus, American photographer
- Arthur Naparstek, social worker and academic
- Pete Rock, rapper, DJ and producer
- Ken Singleton, Major League Baseball player
- C.L. Smooth, rapper
- JB Smoove, actor, comedian, writer
- Al B. Sure!, singer
- Denzel Washington, actor
- Carol Wax, printmaker
- E. B. White, writer

=== Notable basketball players ===
- Isaiah Cousins (born 1994) - currently the Israeli Basketball Premier League; formerly the University of Oklahoma and the Sacramento Kings
- Richie Garner - Manhattan College, drafted by New York Knicks (later assistant principal at the high school)
- Ben Gordon - University of Connecticut, Chicago Bulls, Detroit Pistons, Charlotte Bobcats
- Rudy Hackett - Syracuse University, Spirits of St. Louis, New York Nets, Indiana Pacers
- Kevin Jones - West Virginia University, Cleveland Cavaliers
- Chris Lowe - University of Massachusetts
- Rodney McCray - University of Louisville, Houston Rockets, 1992–93 NBA champion Chicago Bulls, NCAA champion
- Scooter McCray - University of Louisville, Cleveland Cavaliers, and Seattle SuperSonics
- Lowes Moore - West Virginia University, New Jersey Nets, Cleveland Cavaliers
- Demetre Roberts - player in Serbia
- Earl Tatum - Marquette University, Los Angeles Lakers
- Gus Williams - University of Southern California, Seattle SuperSonics (1979 NBA Champions)
- Ray Williams - University of Minnesota, New York Knicks

== Notable faculty ==
- Larry Barnes, world title challenging boxer and swimming coach at MVHS
- Henry Littlefield, historian known for his political interpretation of The Wonderful Wizard of Oz
