= Arthur Devis =

English painter

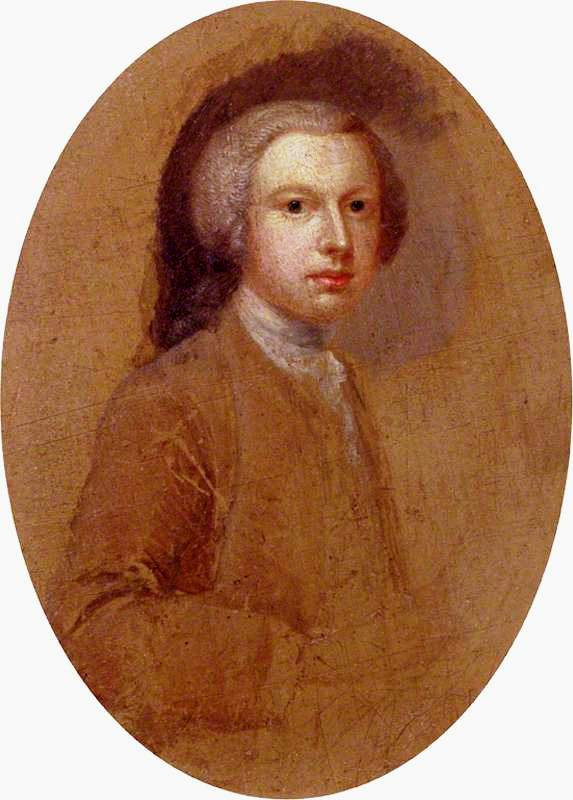
A self-portrait dating from 1742-4

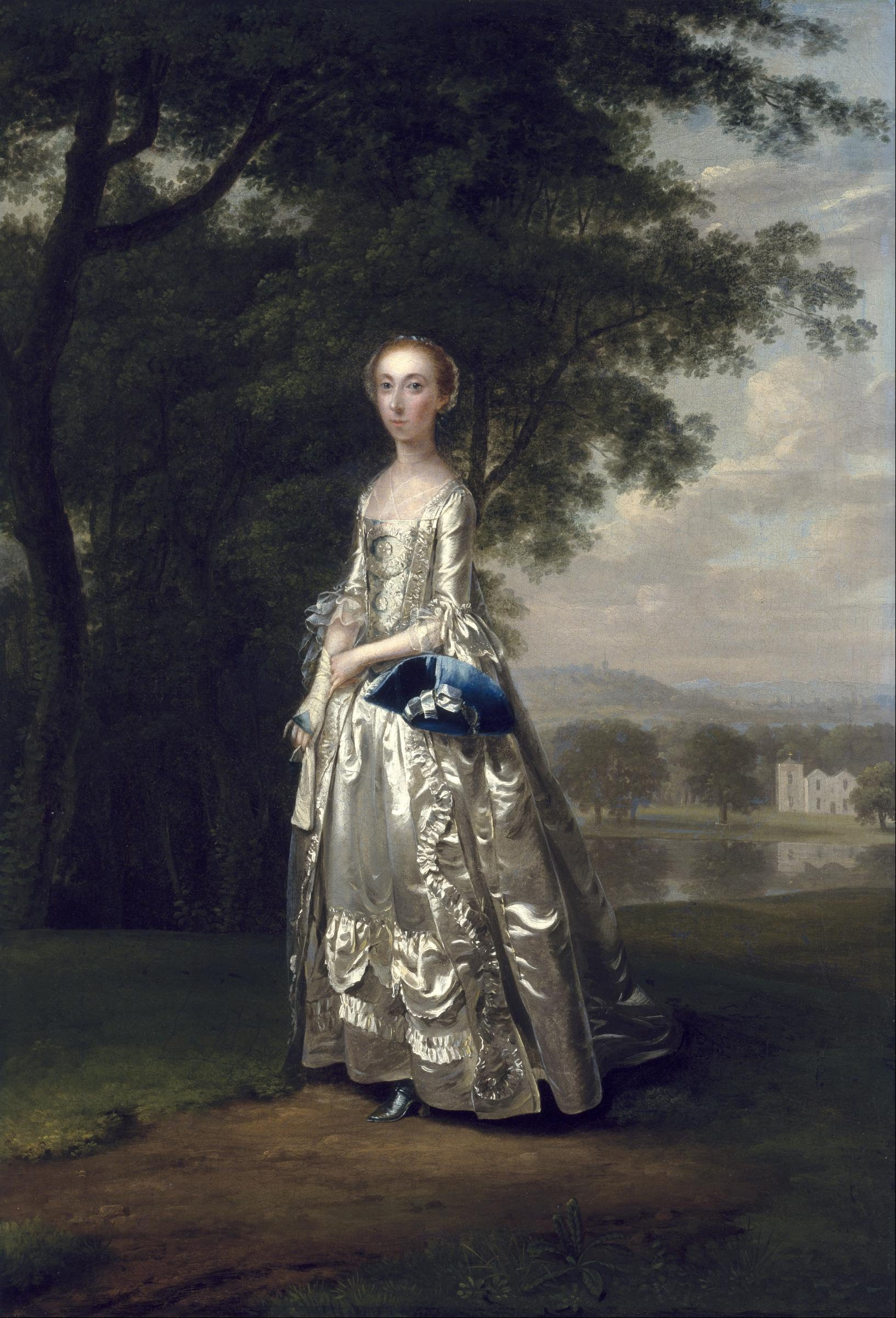
Portrait of a Lady in a Landscape (1750) by Arthur Devis

Arthur Devis (19 February 1712 – 25 July 1787) was an English painter whose father, Anthony, was progenitor of what became a family dynasty of painters and writers. The place of Arthur Devis in art history is generally as painter of the type of portrait now called a conversation piece. After moving to London and apprenticeship to a Flemish topographical artist there, he switched to portraiture and acquired a considerable reputation, although this success did not last. Unable to adapt to later fashionable artistic currents, his commissions declined and his work was largely forgotten after his death until the 20th century revival of interest in the conversation piece.

== Biography ==
Arthur Devis was born in Preston, Lancashire, the eldest son of Anthony Devis, a carpenter and bookseller who ultimately become a freeman of the town and a member of the town council. It may have been his father who was responsible for introducing Devis to the Flemish painter Peter Tillemans, who became his teacher. During the early 1730s, Devis is known to have been an assistant in Tillemans's London studio, apparently copying views of Italy by artists such as Pannini and Marco Ricci. Not surprisingly, the first work Devis painted on commission, a depiction of a house within its park, also shows his interest in landscape ("Hoghton Tower from Duxon Hill, Lancashire", see below). By 1737, however, he had become a portrait painter. In 1745, he established a studio in Great Queen Street, Lincoln's Inn Fields, the location of an academy of painting opened in 1711. By this time he had acquired a considerable artistic reputation.

Drawing upon his father's civic position, Devis also found his clientele among the members of pro-Jacobite Lancashire families and the network of their connections. A story was handed down within his family that Devis himself so resembled the 'young pretender', Charles Edward Stuart, that being taken for the prince on one occasion, he was arrested and in danger for his life. The account later made its way into the revised edition of Matthew Pilkington's Dictionary of Painters and was made a dramatic fragment by the painter's descendant, Martin Farquhar Tupper, as "a true family anecdote" in "The Pretender and his Double" (1881).

Devis was a hard-working craftsman, receiving his greatest number of commissions for portraits between 1748 and 1758, after which he failed to keep abreast of later developments in the work of such artists as Joshua Reynolds and Johann Zoffany. As a consequence he came to be considered mannered and old-fashioned. By 1765, Lord John Cavendish was commenting on a projected portrait of his nephew by Devis: "I am much afraid it will be frightful for I understand, his pictures are all of a sort; they are whole lengths of about 2 feet long & the person is always represented in a genteel attitude, either leaning against a pillar, or standing by a flower pot, or leading an Italian greyhound on a string, or in some other ingenious pose."

Despite his fading reputation, in 1768 Devis became president of the newly founded Free Society of Artists, where he also exhibited works from 1761 onwards, but he was never admitted to membership of the rival Royal Academy. For income he was obliged to take up restoring pictures, though this could be remunerative. As early as 1762 he was working on the ancestral portraits of his patron Sir Roger Newdigate at Arbury Hall. And for repairing and restoring the "Painted Hall" of the Royal Naval Hospital, Greenwich between 1777 and 1778, he received the fee of one thousand pounds.

In 1783 Devis sold all the paintings in his possession and in 1787 died in retirement in Brighton. He was buried in the churchyard of St. Mary Paddington, London.

== Work ==
With the 20th century revival of interest in the conversation piece, the artist was described as "the tireless Devis" according to the first survey of the genre. Later scholarship by Ellen Gates D'Oench more than doubled the number of ascriptions to him from 116 to 281 paintings.

Due to his early training under Tillemans, Devis's first paintings were panoramic landscapes of stylized detail with minute figures moving about them. The view of Hoghton Tower (1735) is one such; another of the same period features Hornby Hall and Castle. This manner was easily adapted to the later background depictions of the mansions and grounds of those who commissioned from Devis the portraits of themselves and their families, as in the 1747 paintings of Atherton Hall and Okeover Hall below. By the 1750s the focus was more on a central figure, often leaning with elegant grace against a tree – or, in the case of Philip Howard below, seated on a chair to one side with buildings reduced to details in the distant landscape.

It has been remarked that what appears in a Devis painting is often "a magical world of make-believe" which portrays its sitters and their surroundings, not as they actually were but as they aspired for them to be. Depictions of buildings by Devis cannot always be taken as proof of their actual appearance. The portrayal of Okeover Hall is one example. There were several revised sets of architect's drawings for this, and the design sent as a guide and painted by Devis is completely different from the one eventually chosen by the owner. The people grouped in the foreground, displaying all the trappings of leisure, are obviously studio portraits and Devis was not required to visit the site of the unfinished building project. If he had, he would have realised, not just that the house was being built to a different plan but that, without workmen of any sort visible, his idealised landscape hid a very different social reality than the one he was required to depict. Another example of judicious concealment is the bucolic background given "Edward Rookes-Leeds and his Family" (c.1763-8), the source of whose income was the industrial workings that occupied the bulk of his estate.

Devis's impressive interiors, too, are more often imaginatively concocted out of architectural pattern books than based on reality. One exception is the neo-Gothic library at Arbury Hall shown in Devis's portrait of Roger Newdigate (1756-8), who holds the plan for the room on his knee. On the other hand, "Breaking-up Day at John Clayton's School in Salford" (1738-40), with its confused transition from inside to outside, is pure Baroque fantasy. The actual building had no such noble stonework as shown but was of brick. Doubtless much of this was an understood convention of the conversation piece genre; but arising from it is the possibility suggested that one aspect of Devis's practice was to have paintings of figures in such interiors ready prepared in his studio and requiring only the faces to be filled in - with a sliding scale of charges for extra details such as an elaborate carpet or ceramics on a mantelpiece.

It is a commonplace to describe the figures in Devis's paintings as "doll-like", and with good reason. In common with other artists of his time such as Joshua Reynolds and Thomas Gainsborough, Devis possessed a number of articulated lay-figures which could be clothed in the latest fashions and so posed as to save his sitters the inconvenience of frequently visiting his studio. These could be arranged according to the recommendations of such books as François Nivelon's deportment manual, The Rudiments of Genteel Behaviour (1737) whose conventionality was later deplored by Lord Cavendish.

Given these conventions, however, by studying Devis's paintings it was possible to decode the message about themselves that his sitters wished to convey. For example, the painting of "A Gentleman and Lady at the Harpsichord" (otherwise known as "The Duet", 1749), suggests conjugal harmony, but also the hierarchy within the marriage relationship. He hands her the music with which she will accompany his playing on the violin that lies ready on the piano. Another sign of her background role is that she sits, while he is standing nearer the window. The man's financial status is further suggested by the fact that the light source is the handsome three-sectioned Palladian window which had only just come into fashion. A cultured and fashionable interest in music is also indicated. In other paintings, the globe in the corner of Roger Hesketh's family portrait and the apparatus on display in that of the academic John Bacon FRS (both c. 1742-3), establish that they are men of learning with scientific preoccupations.

== Gallery ==
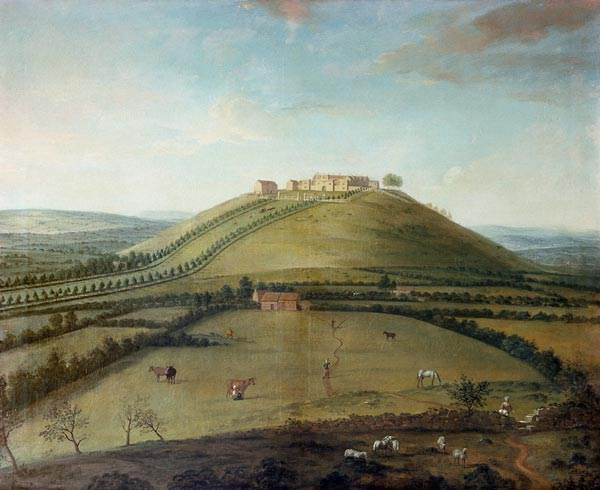
Hoghton Tower in Lancashire

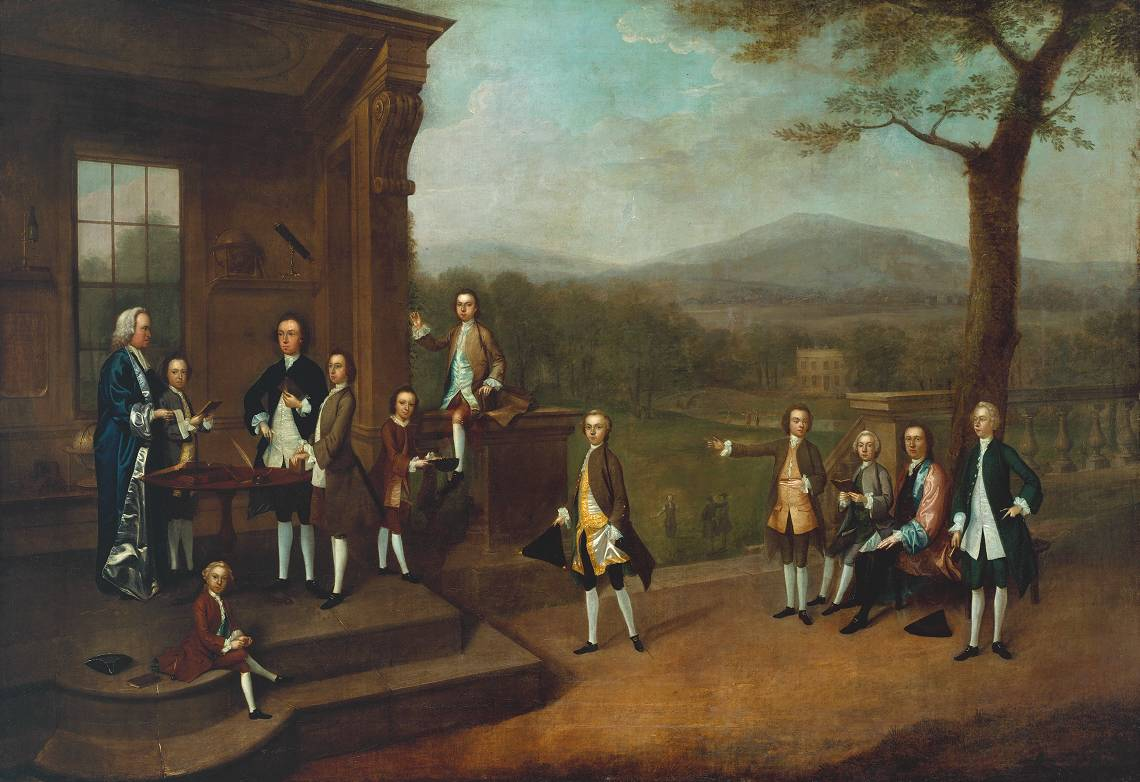
Breaking-Up Day at Dr Clayton's School at Salford (c. 1738)

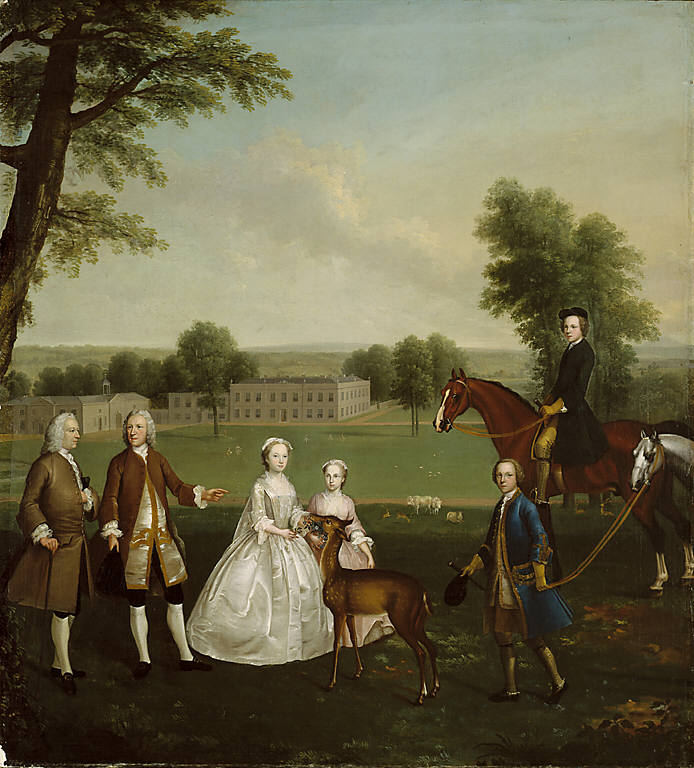
Thomas Lister and His Family (1740-1741)

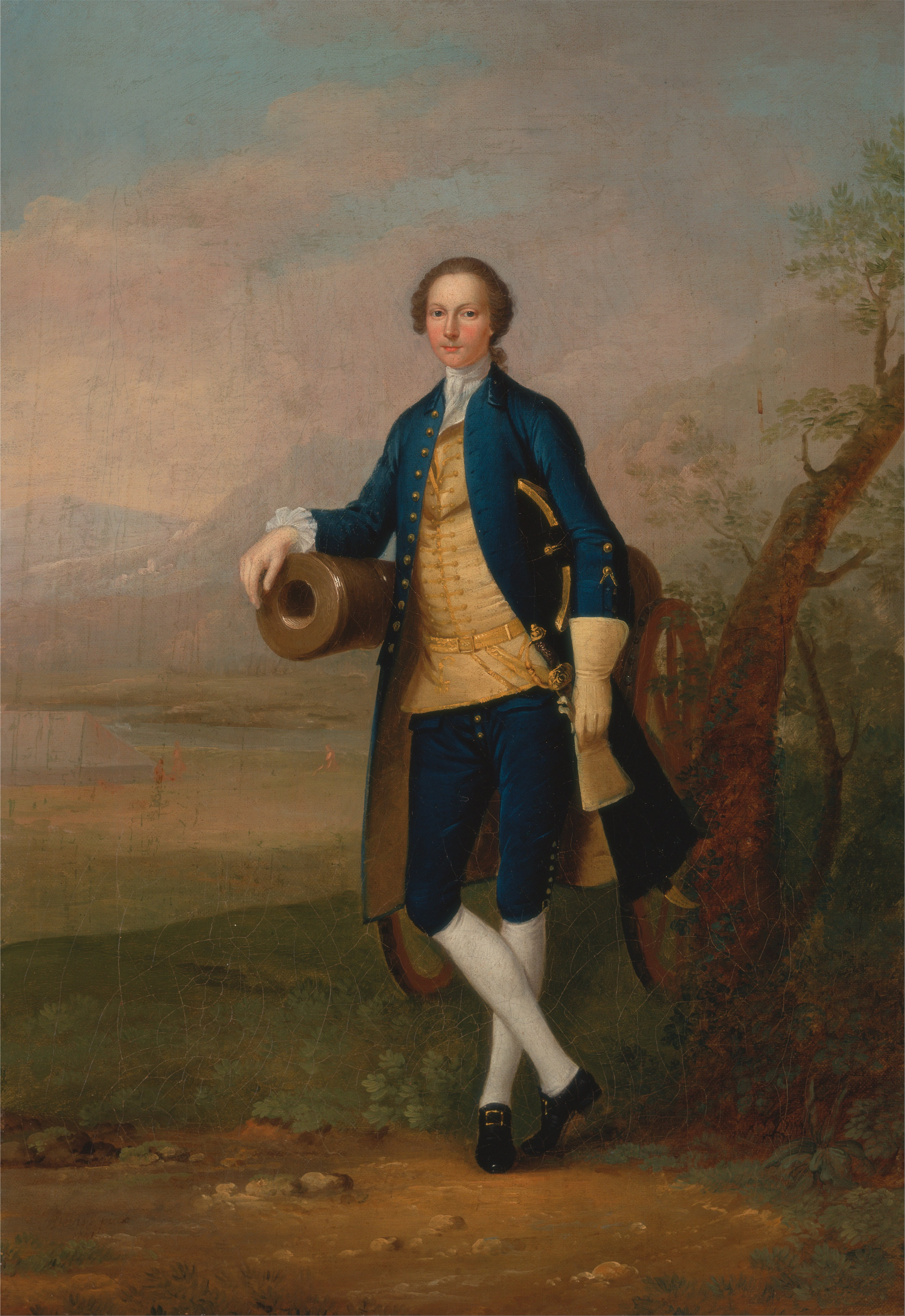
Gentleman with a Cannon (1741)

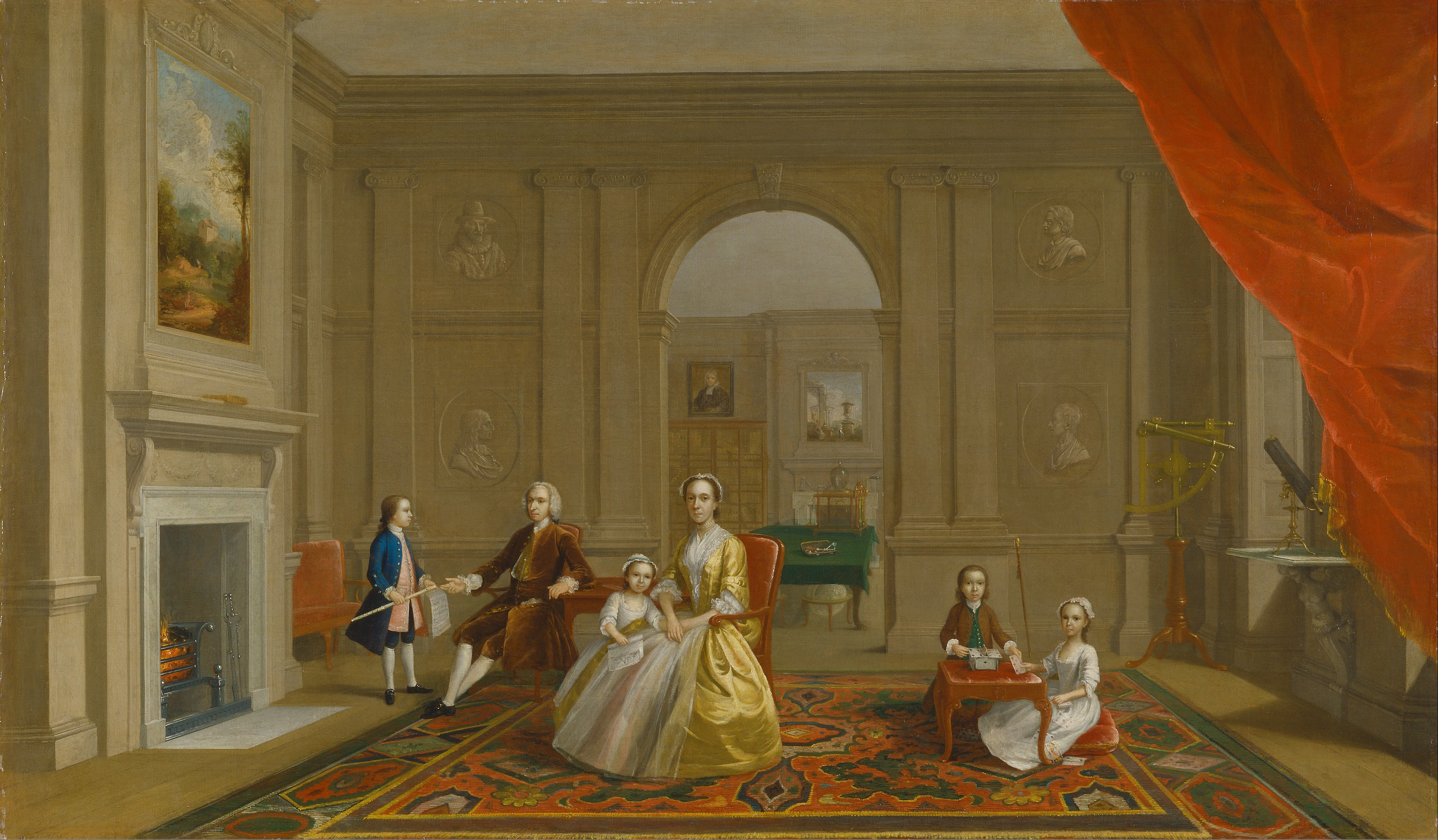
The John Bacon Family (1742)

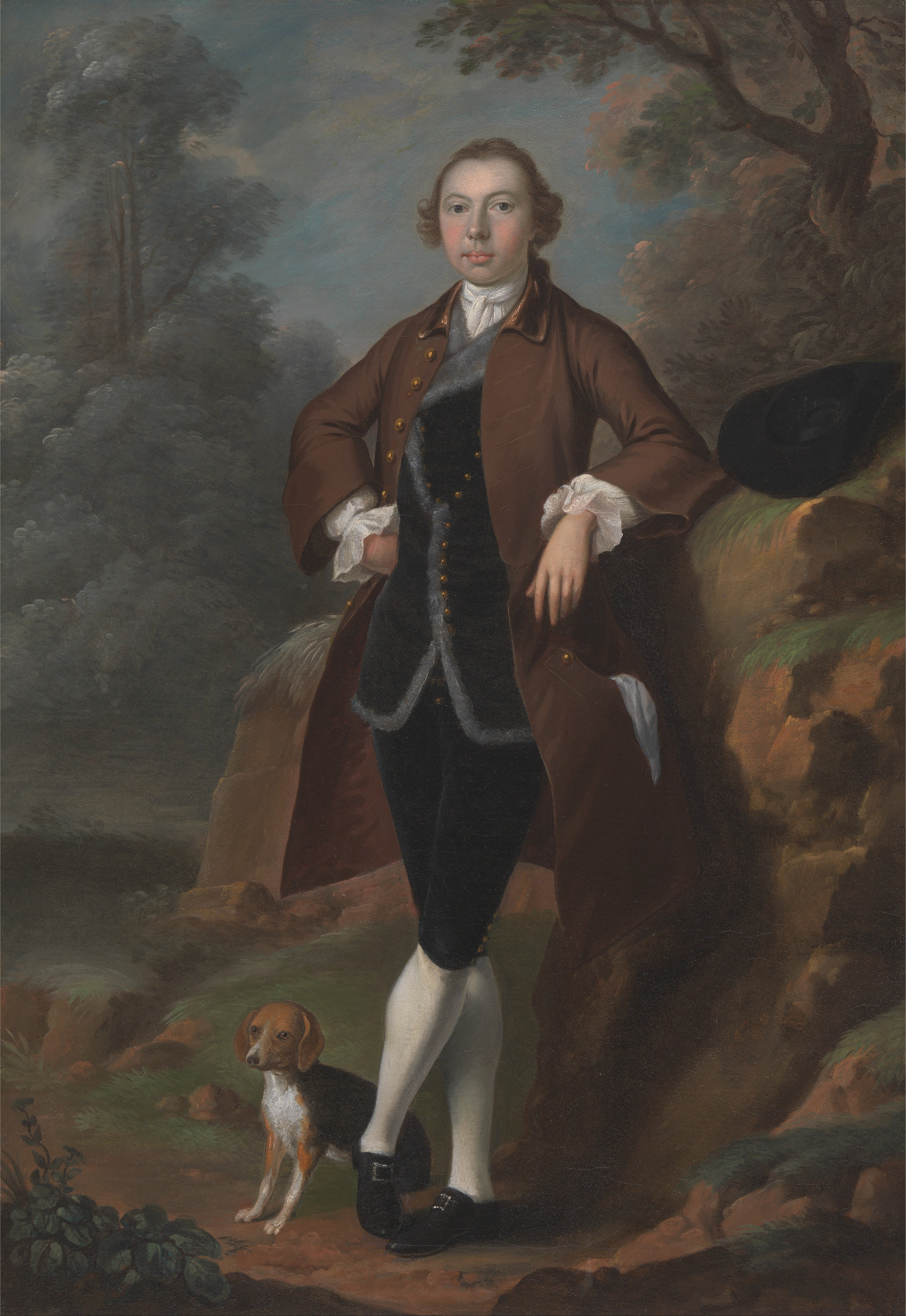
William Farrington of Shawe Hall, Lancashire (c. 1743)

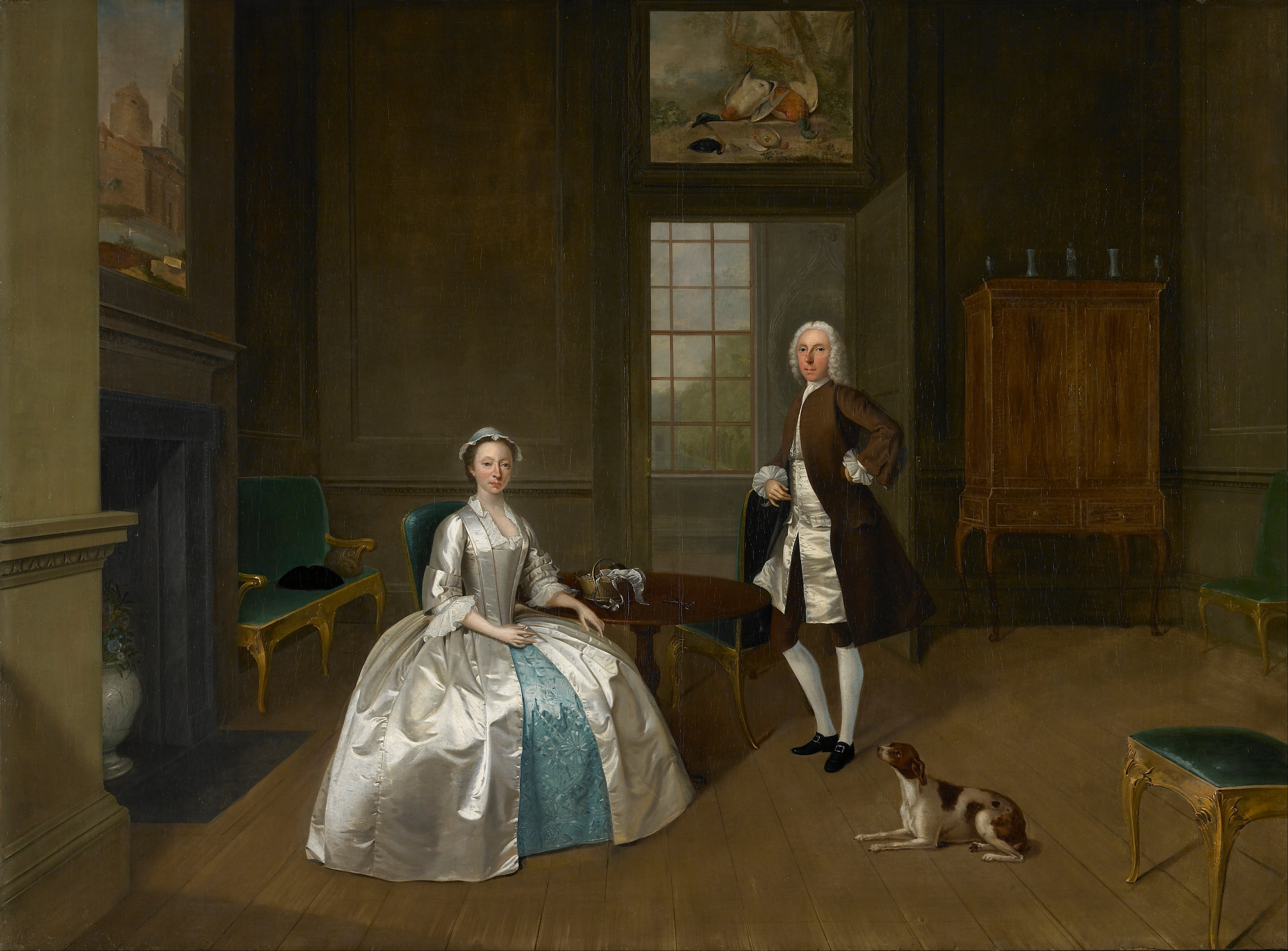
Mr and Mrs William Atherton (1744)

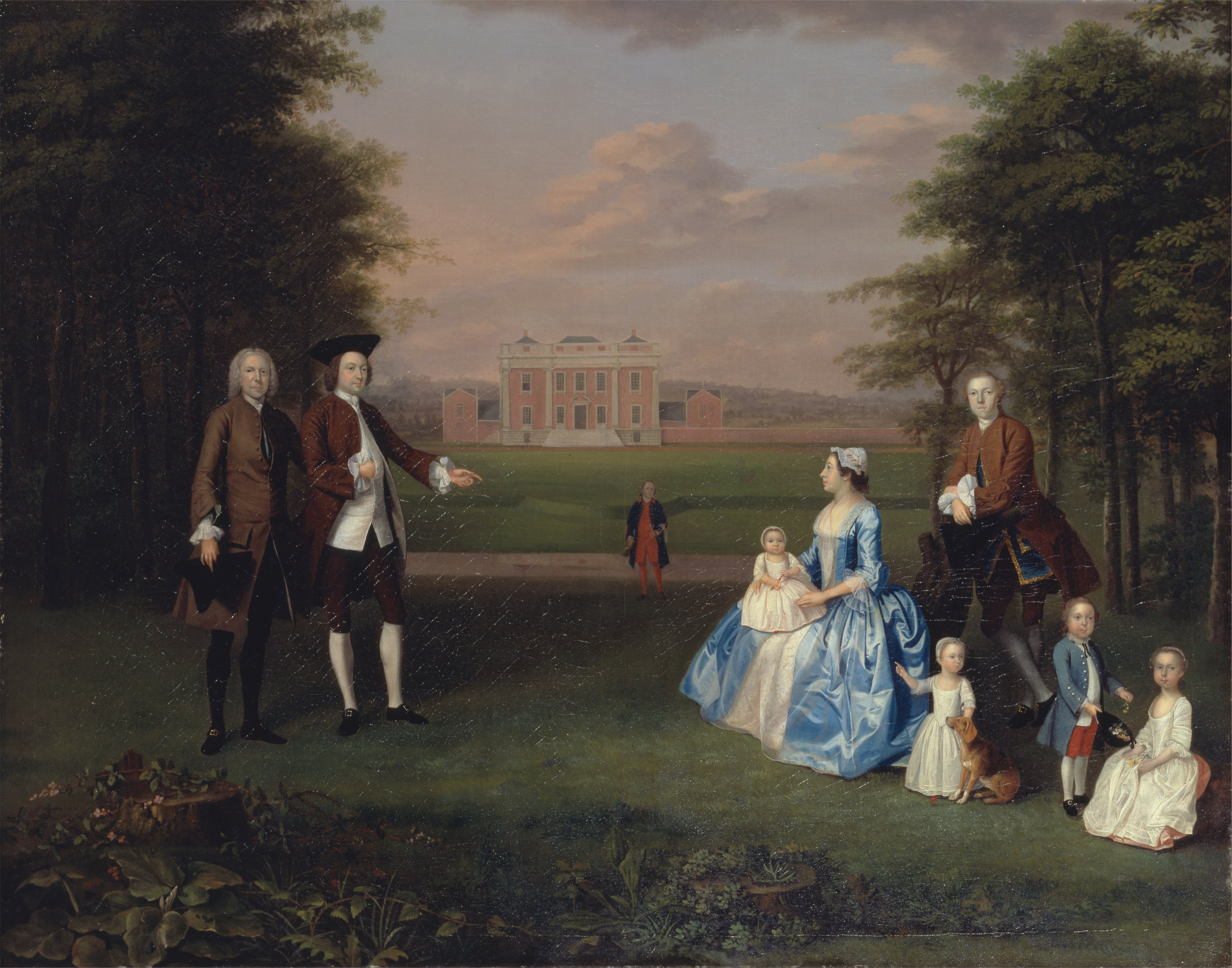
Robert Vernon Atherton Gwillym of Atherton Hall and His Family (1745-1747)

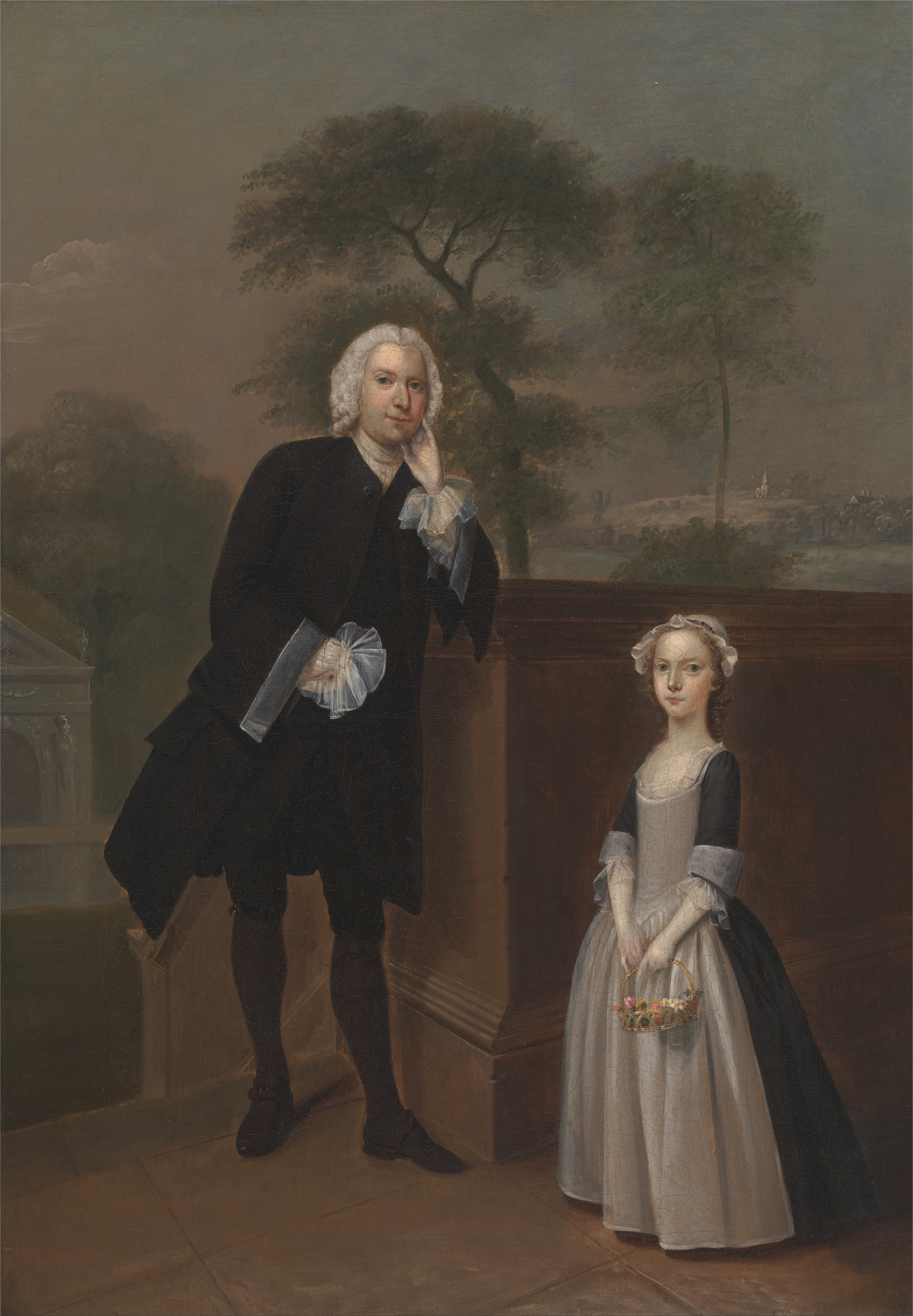
An Unknown Man with His Daughter (1746-1748)

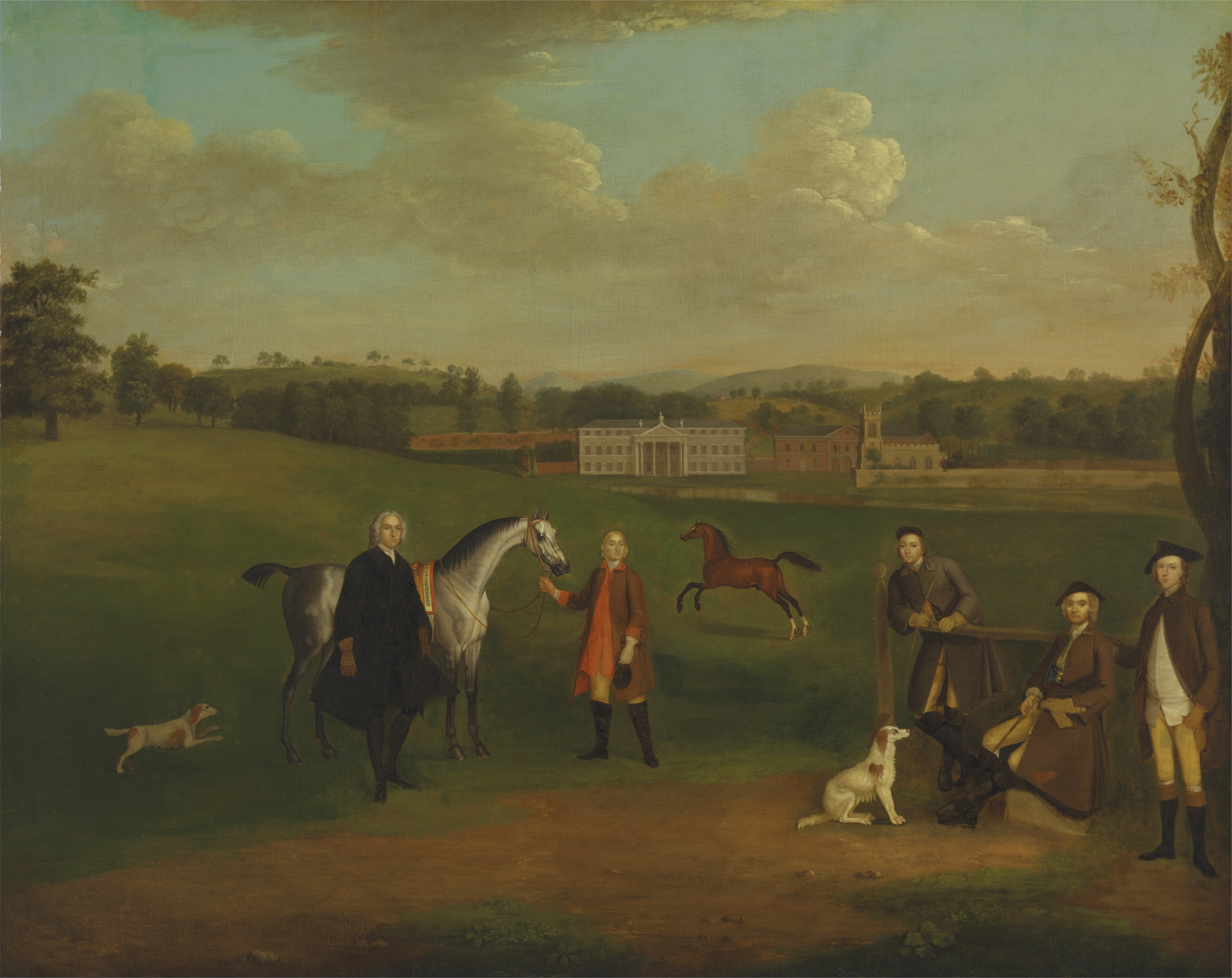
Leak Okeover, Rev. John Allen and Captain Chester at Okeover Hall, Staffordshire (1747)

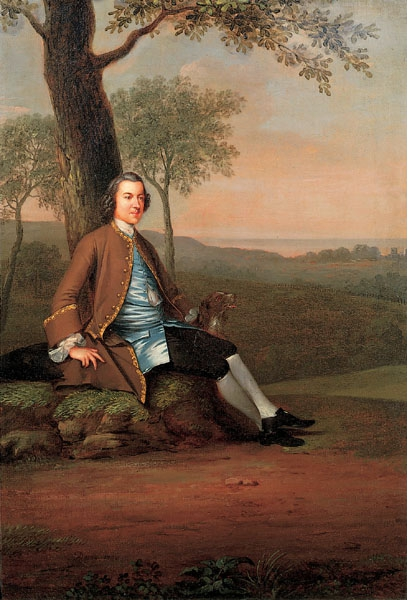
Mr Peter Ducane (1747)

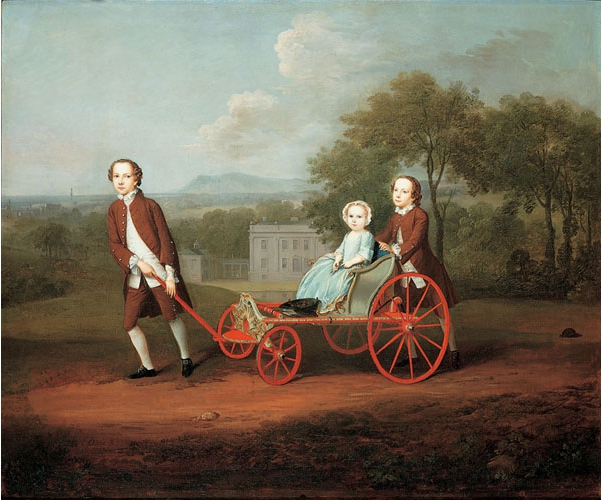
The Children of Mr & Mrs Peter Ducane (1747)

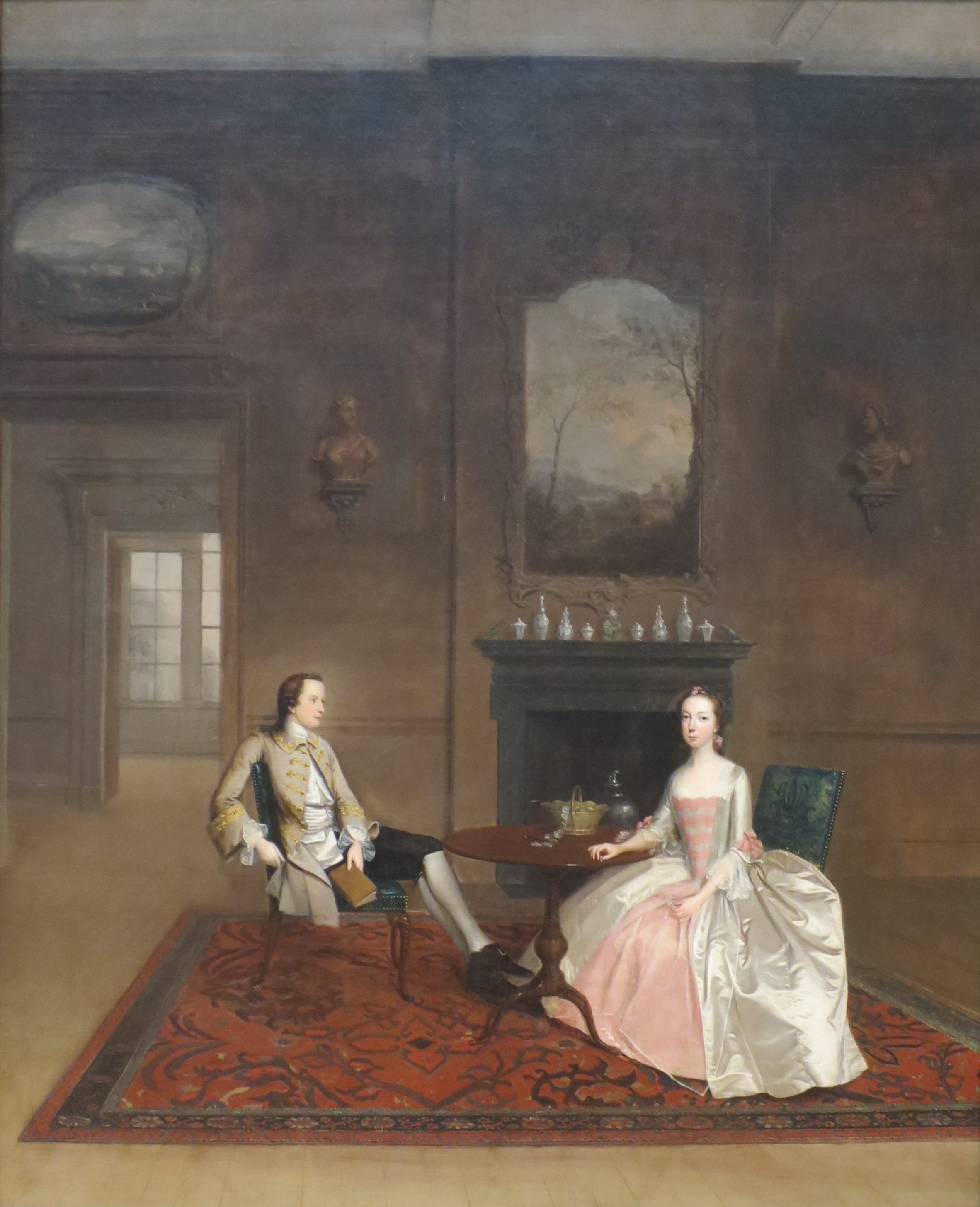
Mr. and Mrs. Richard Bull (1747)

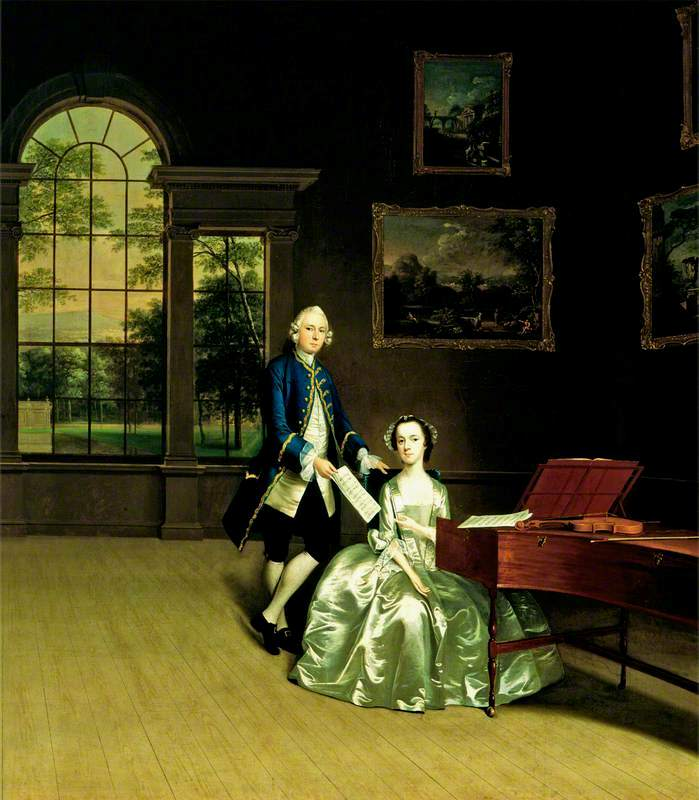
The Duet (1749), Victoria & Albert Museum

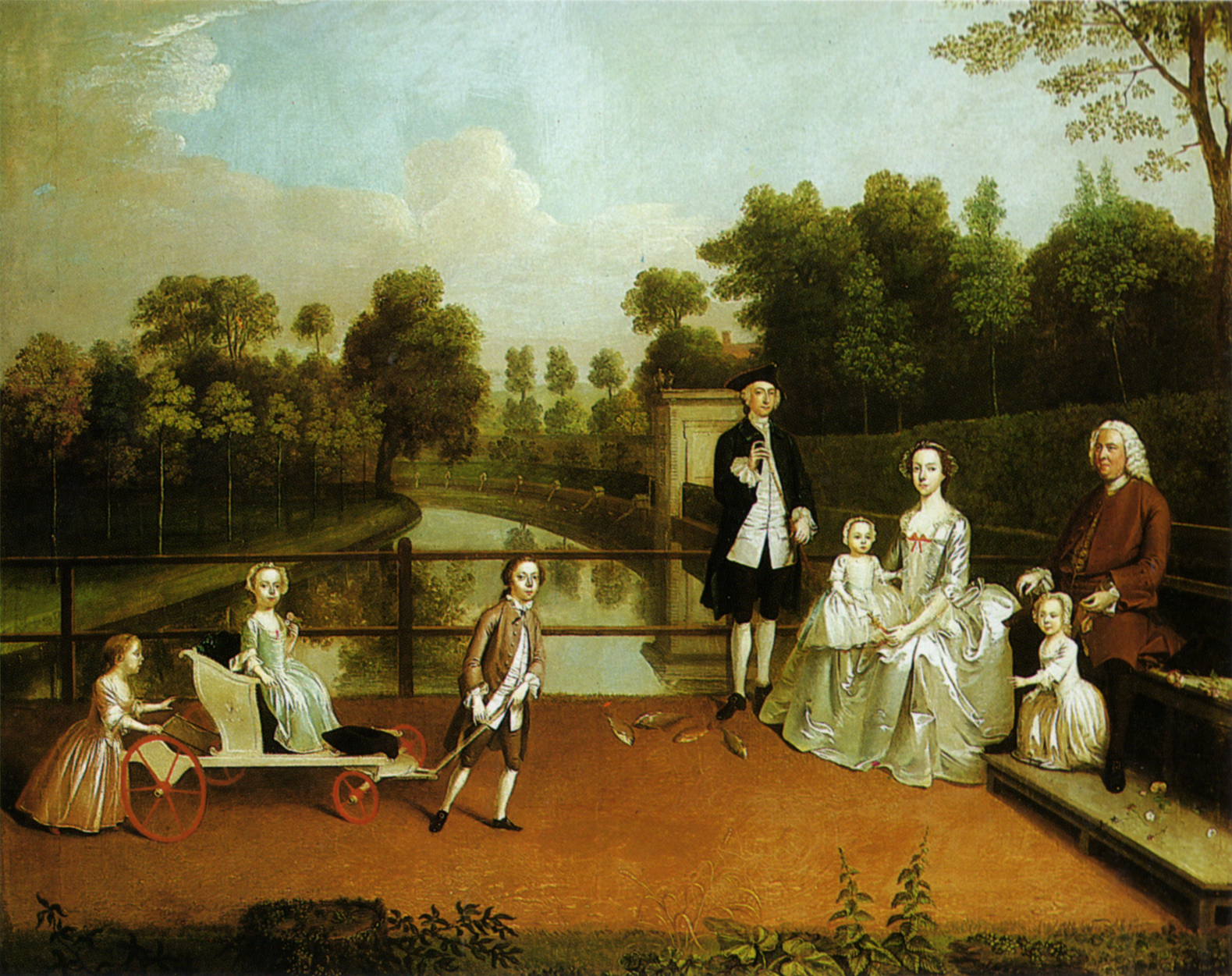
Thomas Cave Family (1749)

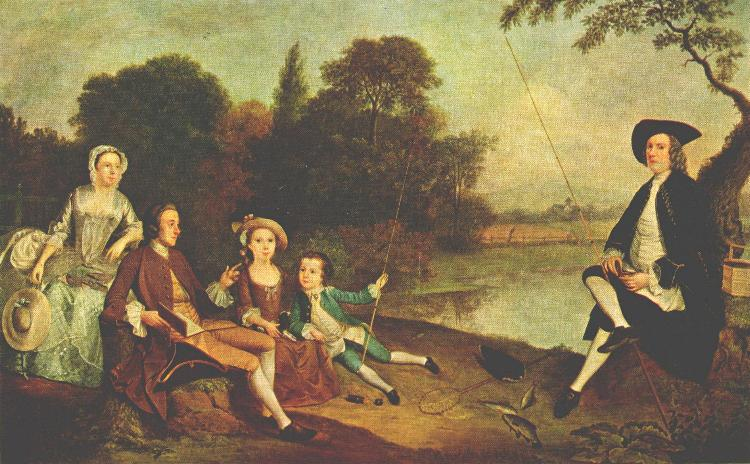
A Family of Anglers (perhaps the Swaine Family of Fencroft, Cambridgeshire) (1749)

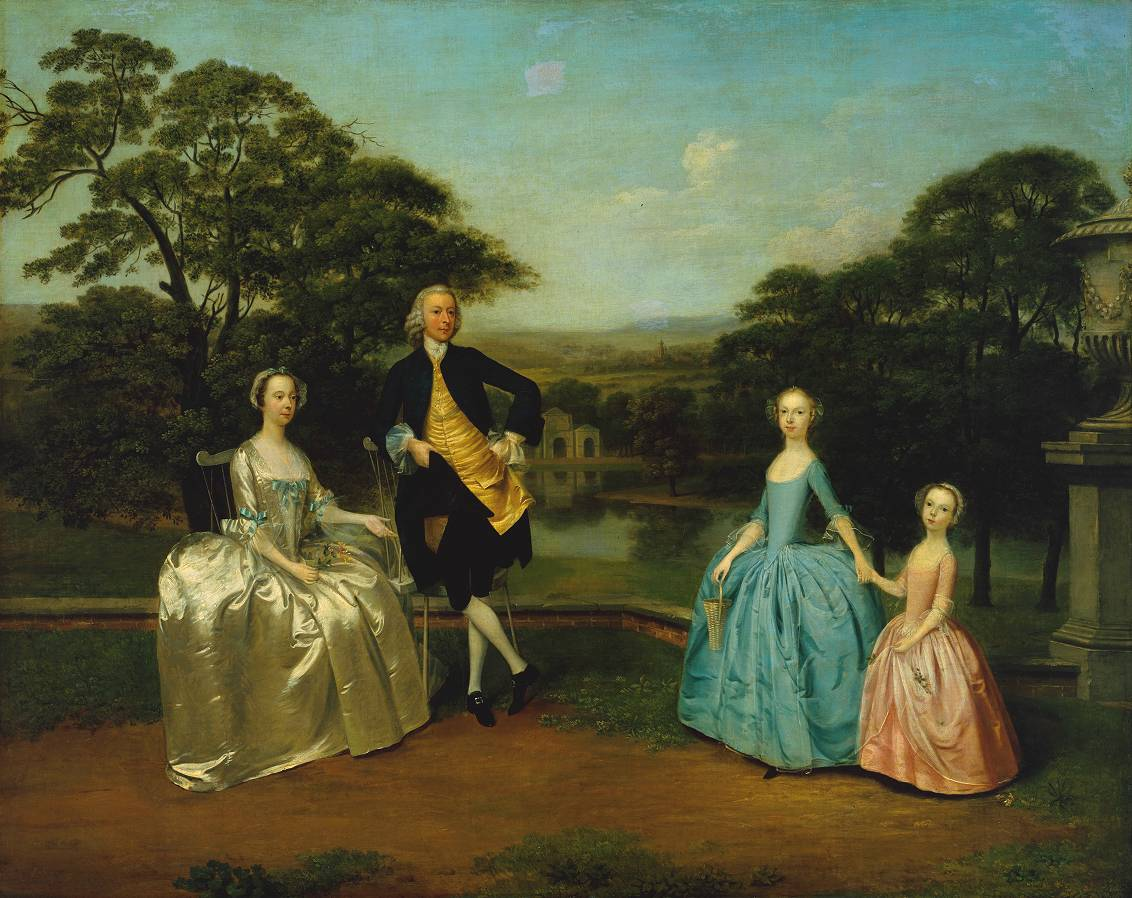
The James Family (1751)

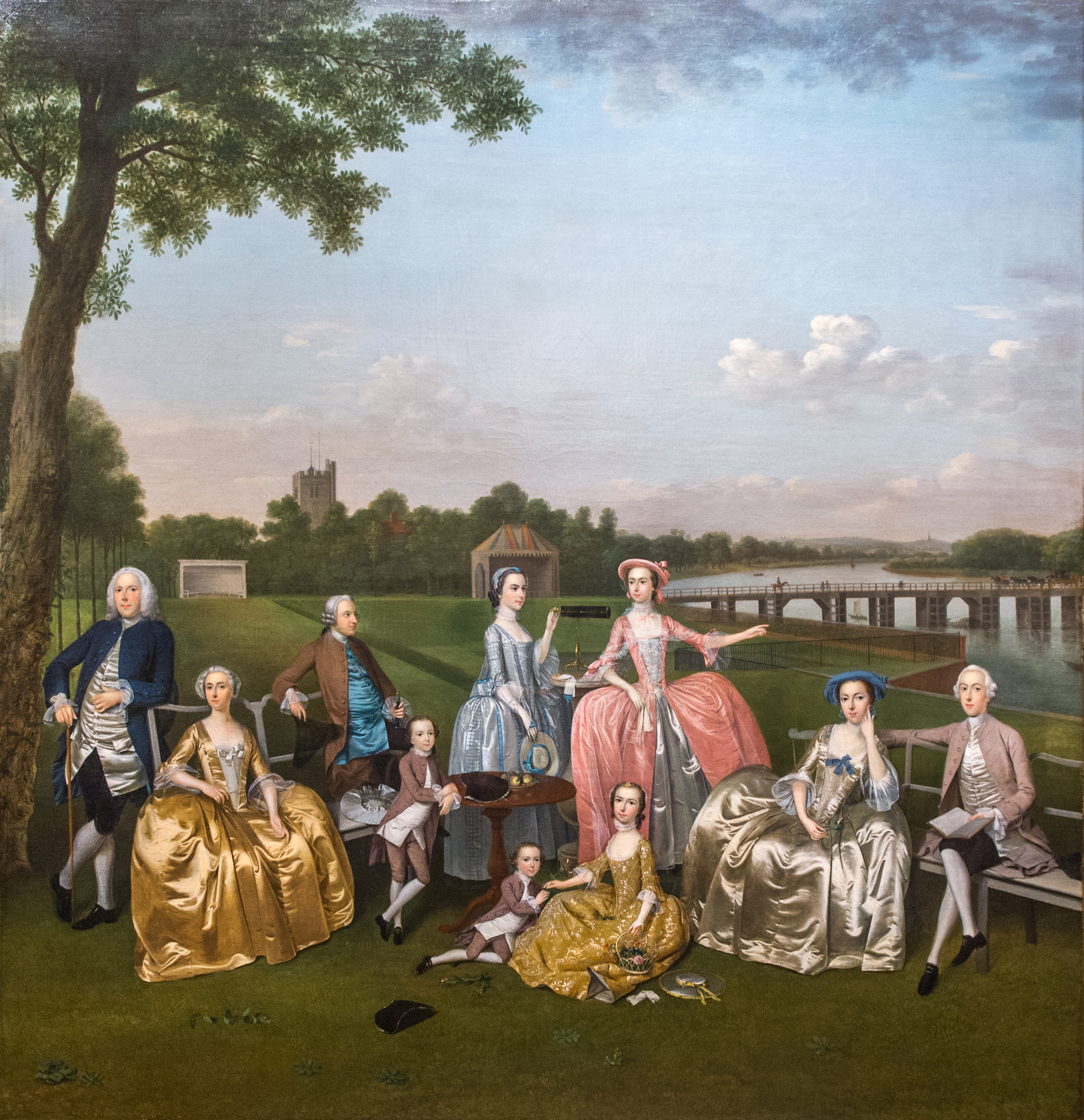
Sir Joshua Vanneck, 1st Baronet and Family at Roehampton House, Putney (1752)

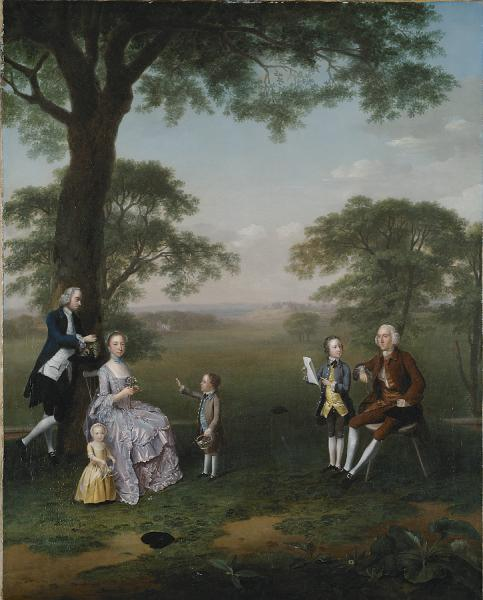
The Clavey family in their garden at Hampstead (1754)

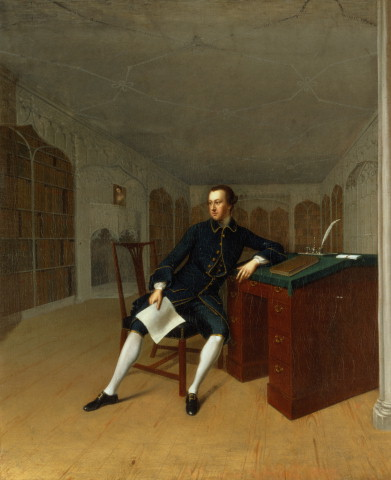
Sir Roger Newdigate in his Gothic Revival Library at Arbury Hall (1756-1758)

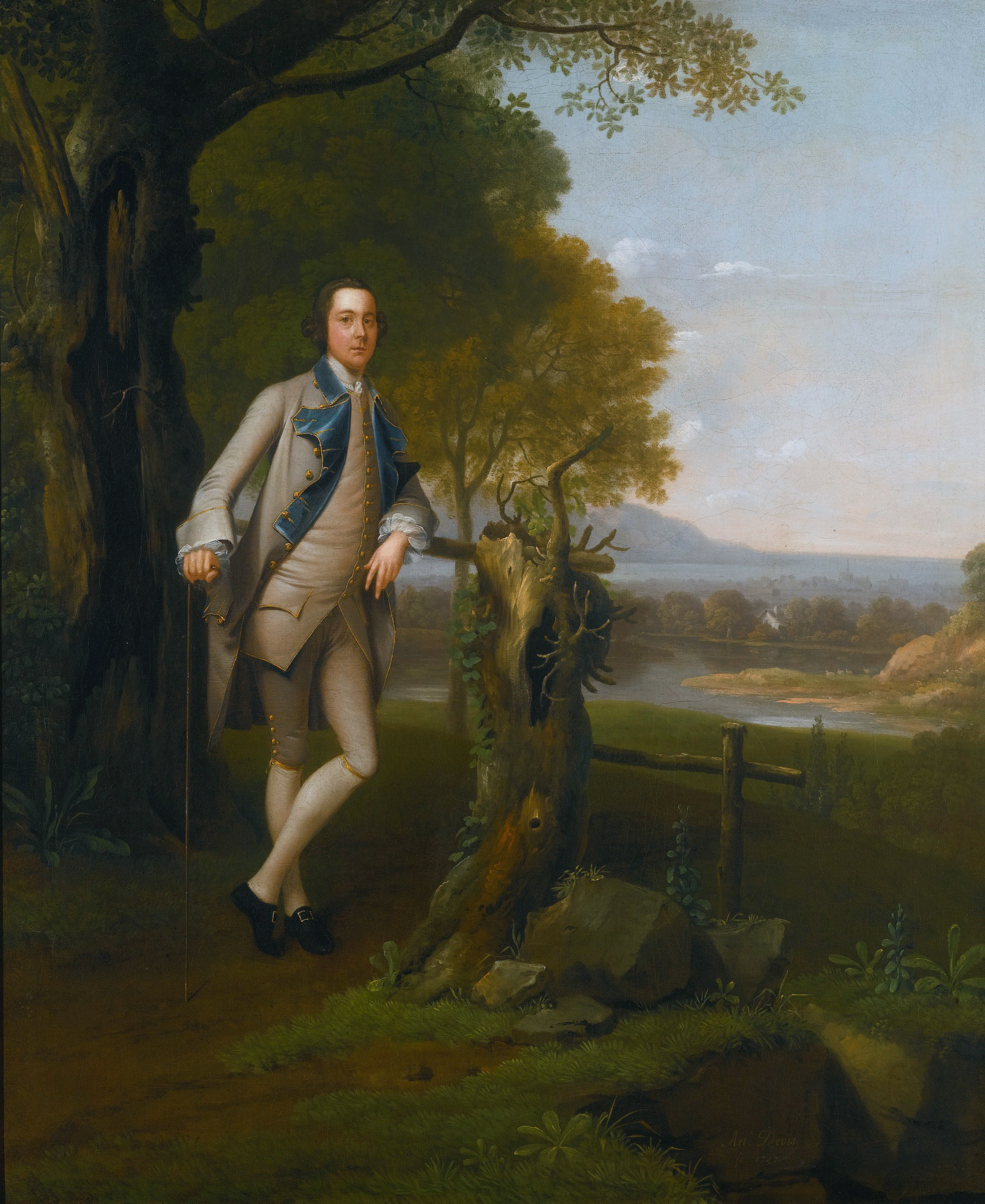
John Shaw, 4th Bt (1728-1799), of Eltham Lodge (1757)

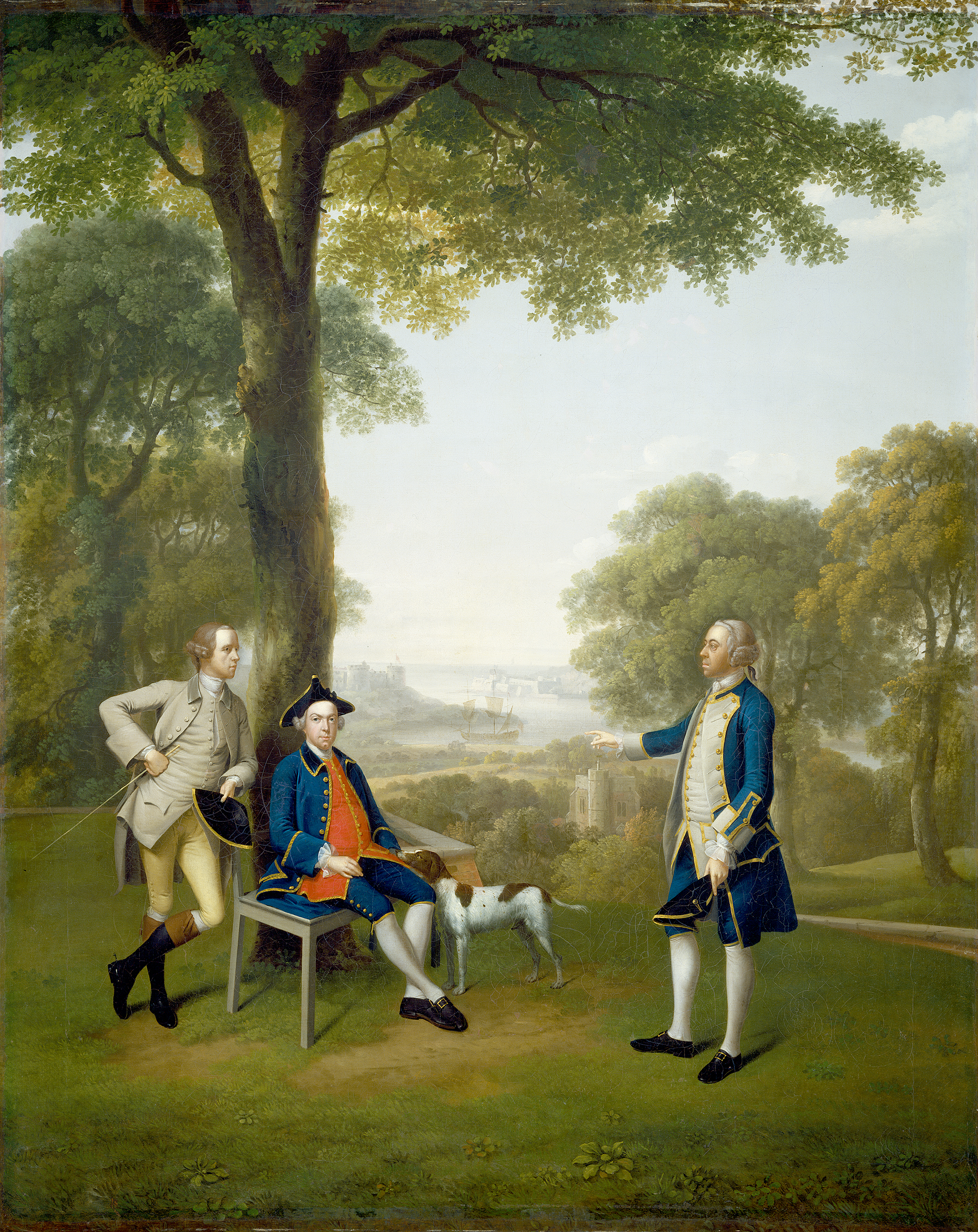
Arthur Holdsworth Conversing with Thomas Taylor and Captain Stancombe by the River Dart (1757)

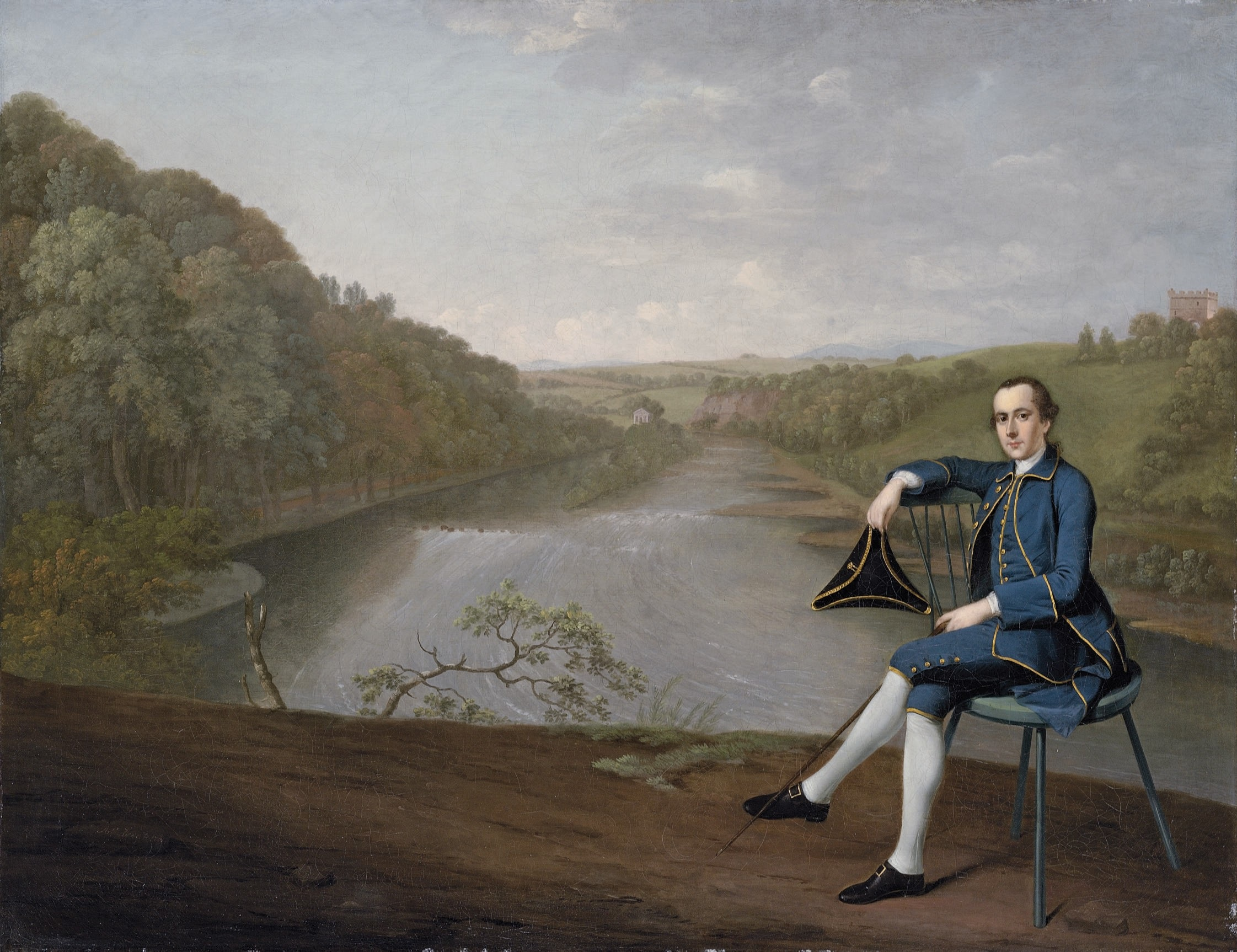
Philip Howard of Corby Castle, Cumberland (1759)

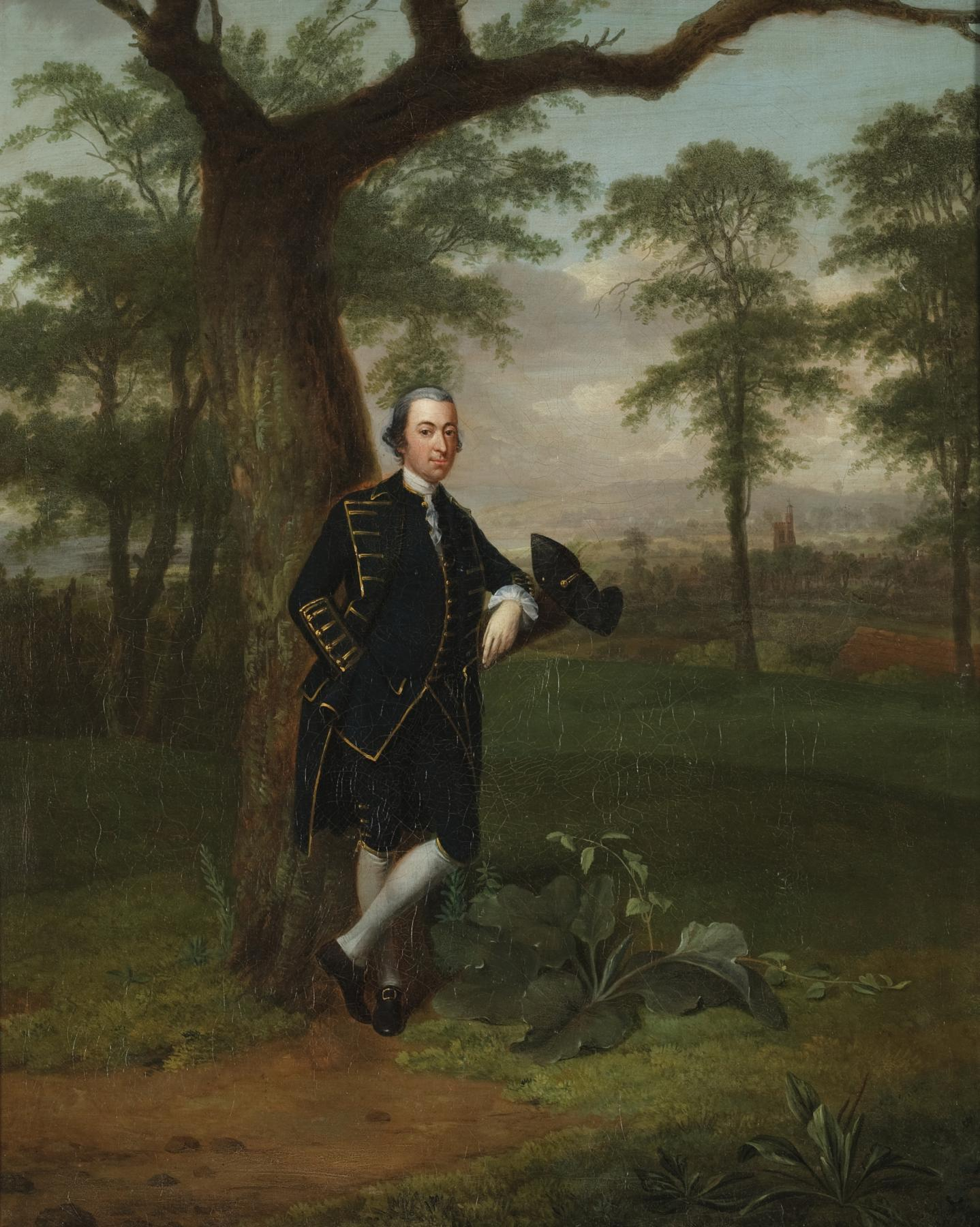
Sir John van Hatten (c. 1760-1761)

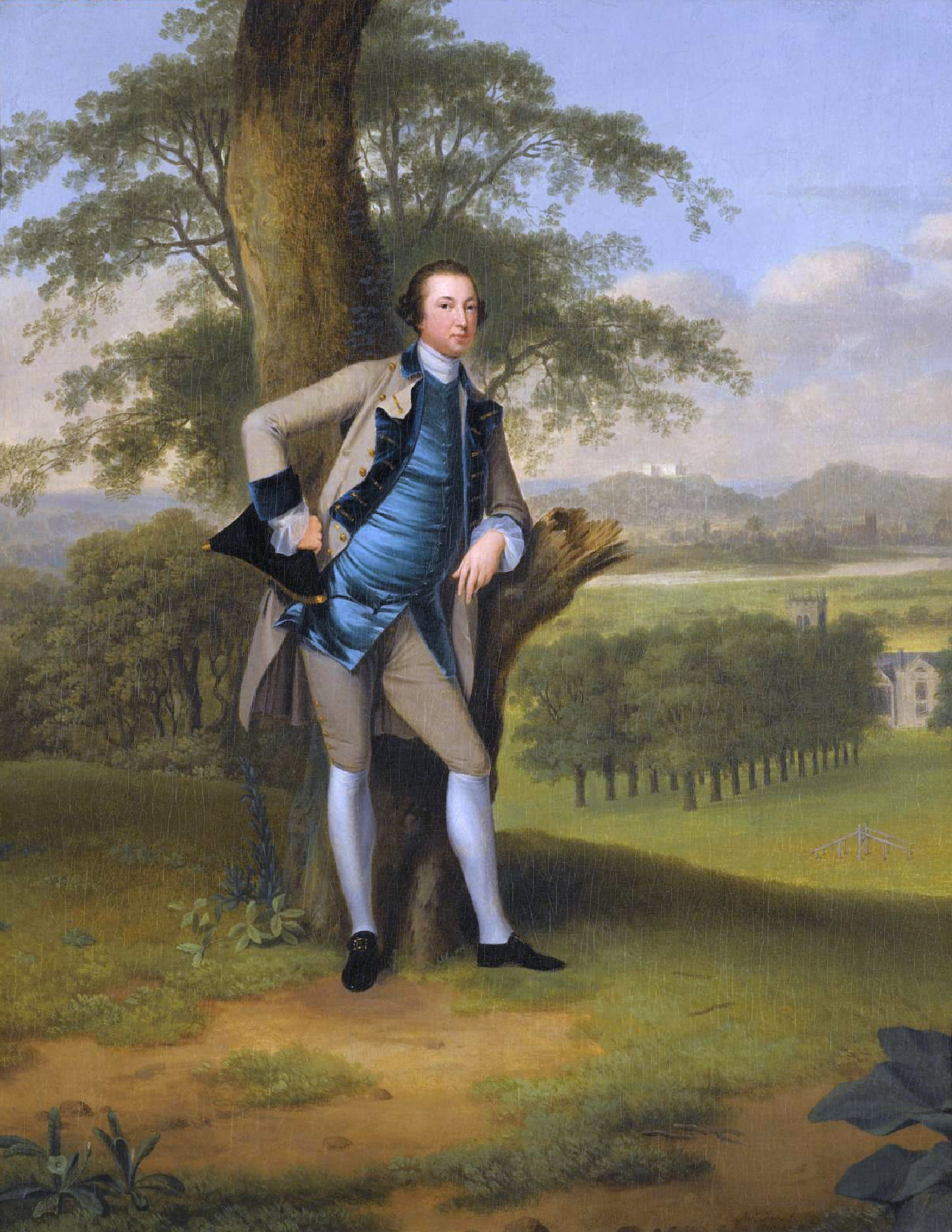
Lord Robert Manners-Sutton (1722-1762)

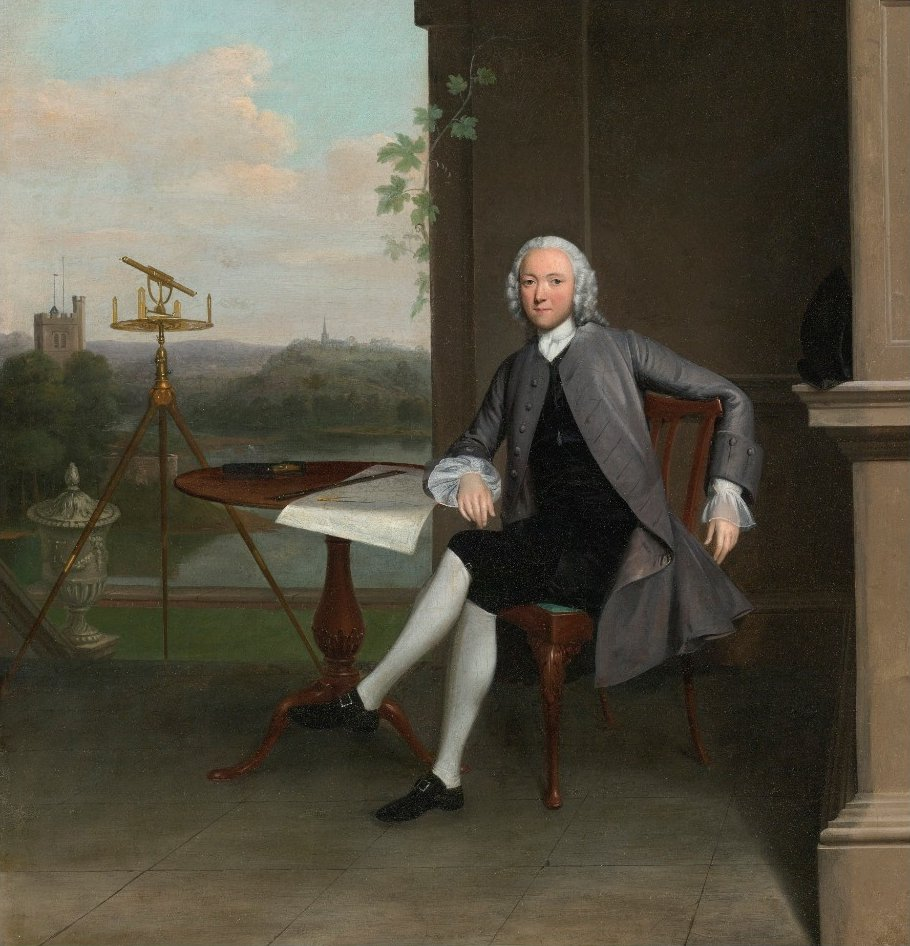
Jonas Hanway

== Family ==
Devis married Elizabeth Faulkner (1719–1788) at St Katharine's by the Tower, London, on 20 July 1742. Of the marriage were born twenty-two children, only six of whom survived past infancy. Two sons, Thomas Anthony Devis (1757–1810) and his younger brother, Arthur William Devis, became painters. One daughter, Ellin Devis, was a schoolmistress and author of the popular grammar The Accidence (1775). Devis's half-brother Anthony Devis also was a painter, as was a son-in-law, Robert Marris, who as a young man had lived and travelled with Anthony Devis and later married Arthur Devis's daughter Frances. In his turn, Marris had for pupil Richard Corbould, who painted miniatures of Devis and his wife for the model tomb commissioned after their deaths by their daughter Ellin. The family's creative dynasty was also to continue into the following century. For example, the physician Martin Tupper married Robert Marris's only daughter, Ellin Devis Marris, and their eldest son, the poet and writer Martin Farquhar Tupper, married his cousin Isabella Devis, daughter of Arthur William Devis. The daughters of this marriage went on to publish Poems by Three Sisters in 1864, while one of them, Ellin Isabelle, left a biographical account of the family at the end of the century.

== Sources ==
- Belsey, Hugh. "Devis" in Oxford Art Online (updated 04/07/04)
- D'Oench, Ellen G. (1980). The conversation piece : Arthur Devis & his contemporaries (Exh. cat.). New Haven: Yale Center for British Art. ISBN 0-930606-28-0.
- D'Oench, Ellen G. (2008). "Dictionary of National Biography entry for Arthur Devis". Oxford University Press.
- Pavière, Sydney Herbert, The Devis Family of Painters, Lewis, Leigh-on-Sea 1950
- Polite Society by Arthur Devis, Harris Museum and Art Gallery, Preston, Exh. cat., 1983
- Seguier, Frederick Peter (1870). A critical and commercial dictionary of the works of painters. Longmans, Green, and co. p. 56. "devis."
