= Robert F. Sheehan =

American photographer

Robert Francis Sheehan (1922–1969) was an American photographer. He lived in Connecticut. Sheehan is known for his abstract color photography.

Ellen D'Oench, who directed Wesleyan University's Davison Art Center wrote about and catalogued his work. The Davison Art Center at Wesleyan University has a large collection of his works. The Museum of Modern Art (MoMA) in New York City has a couple of his works in their collection.
