= Herakleidon Art Museum =

Herakleidon Museum
- Former name: Herakleidon Art Museum
- Established: 2004
- Location: Athens, Greece
- Coordinates: 37.975193°N 23.718582°E
- Type: Interactive center of science popularization and technology
- Accreditation: International Council of Museums
- Founder: Paul and Anna-Belinda Firos

The Herakleidon Museum is a non-profit cultural organization founded in 2004 by Paul and Anna-Belinda Firos. You can find it in the historic district of Thissio, next to the Acropolis, the Ancient Agora and the Temple of Hephaestus. It is located at 16 Herakleidon street in Athens.

== History ==
During the first decade of its operation, the museum focused on artistic activities and organized exhibitions with artworks artists such as M.C. Escher, Victor Vasarely, Carol Wax, Constantin Xenakis, Adolf Luther, Francesco Scavullo, Toulouse-Lautrec, Edgar Degas, Edvard Munch, Sol LeWitt and others. At the same time, a plethora of cultural activities allowed visitors to explore the essence of each artist's perspective.

Today, the Herakleidon Museum serves as an interactive center of science popularization and a technological museum that focuses on antiquity, with emphasis on the achievements of the ancient Greeks. Based on the philosophy of the educational programs that Greece itself established, such as the triptych of Science, Art and Mathematics, the museum offers educational programs inspired by its exhibition "EUREKA, Science, Art and Technology of the Ancient Greeks."
