= Carol Wax =

American art historian

- Born: June 17, 1953 (age 73); New York City, New York, US
- Education: 1971–75 Manhattan School of Music, New York, NY, Bachelor of Music degree, flute/performance major
- Occupations: Printmaker, author, teacher
- Years active: 1975–present
- Awards: Louise Nevelson Award for Excellence in Printmaking, Concordia Career Advancement Award,

Carol Wax (born June 17, 1953) is an American artist, author and teacher whom the New York Times called "a virtuoso printmaker and art historian" for her work in mezzotint and her writings on the history and technique of that medium.

== Early years ==
Carol Wax was born in New York City on June 17, 1953. She graduated from Mount Vernon High School in 1971.

After a year at the Manhattan School of Music, she participated in flute master classes with Jean-Pierre Rampal at the International Summer School, Nice, France. She earned a Bachelor of Music degree in 1975 from the Manhattan School of Music, where she majored in flute performance. She continued to work as a professional musician until 1980.

In the summers of 1975 and 1976, she took printmaking courses at the Lake Placid School of Art and then studied from 1976 to 1982 at the Pratt Graphics Center in New York City, where she made lithographs and was introduced to mezzotint engraving. She had her first solo museum exhibition at the Wichita Art Museum in 1986–1987.

== Mezzotint research ==
Beginning in the mid-1980s, Wax responded to the limitations of current technical knowledge of mezzotint engraving and printing by conducting her own research into historical techniques while continuing to work as a printmaker. Though mezzotint was developed mainly as a method for copying oil paintings, the research explained in her 1990 book, The Mezzotint: History and Technique, uncovered techniques long out of use that had promising applications for use in contemporary art. She held a residency at the MacDowell Colony in Peterborough, New Hampshire, in 1986 and received an Artist's Fellowship Grant from the New York Foundation for the Arts in 1987. Wax conducted technical experiments based on her historical research and for a few years she devoted more of her time to research and writing than her own artistic production.

In 1990, Harry N. Abrams (in the U.S.) and Thames & Hudson (in the U.K.) published the results of her research as The Mezzotint: History and Technique, reissued by Abrams in a soft-cover edition in 1996. Wax photographed all of the technical illustrations for that volume, as well as much of the flatwork, and produced the line drawings. In its two sections, Wax reviewed the history of mezzotint techniques and then detailed their use as a guide for contemporary artists in the craft. A lengthy review in Winterthur Portfolio noted it was the "first comprehensive study of mezzotint...and the most significant discussion of the subject" since a more narrowly focused 1884 study. It said that Wax brought "a technician's attention to detail, an artist's sensitivity to the nuances of process, and a historian's interest in cause and effect" to her work. It praised her exploitation of little-known German publications dating from 1771 and 1889 to expand on familiar historical accounts and her investigation of the impact of such technological developments as steel plates on the artist's technique, types of paper and ink, and the characteristics of the resulting images. Writing in Print Quarterly, Ellen D'Oench said that: "the appearance of Carol Wax's book is an important event...not before now have we had access to an exhaustive treatment of mezzotint's history and process, enriched by copious and superb reproductions....Wax, a mezzotint artist herself, handles with skill a vast amount of information....She excels in her observations about individual prints...and in her selection of reproductions....Wax has a keen eye for the particulars and a broad knowledge of the subject....This is a triumph of word and image in the service of explication."

== Printmaking, exhibiting, and teaching ==
Wax found that her increased technical confidence expanded the scale and complexity of her imagery. Influenced in part by the work of Philip Pearlstein, she produced more refined and intricate treatments of light and shadow, more sophisticated explorations of the ways that light and shadow create the illusions of volume and depth, and more complex layering of pictorial elements. In the years that followed, she received over thirty-five prizes in national and international exhibitions. In 1994 she received the Louise Nevelson Award for Excellence in Printmaking from the American Academy of Arts and Letters.

Wax has executed several commissions for mezzotint editions from Cradle Oak Press at Bradley University, in Peoria, Illinois (1994), Stone and Press Gallery (1994), the Albany Print Club (2002), the Matrix Program at the University of Dallas in Irving, Texas (2003), Indiana University Southeast in New Albany, Indiana (2005), and the Print Club of Rochester, New York (2008). The Marie Walsh Sharpe Art Foundation's Space Program provided Wax with studio space in 1996–1997. That allowed Wax to work with pastels and oil paints for the first time, which in turn affected her engravings even as she determined to work in several mediums. Impatient with the time-consuming requirements of mezzotint's grounding process, Wax developed ways to prepare mezzotint grounds more efficiently and in 1996 designed a system for attaching adjustable weights to the rocker, the mezzotint engraver's most important tool. This invention, the first improvement to rocker design in over three hundred years, is now manufactured by the toolmakers Edward C. Lyons.

Wax curated exhibitions at Heuser Art Center Gallery, Bradley University, in 1994 with John Heintsman and the New Orleans Museum of Art in 1996 with Earl Retif.

At the Rhode Island School of Design, Wax taught several semesters of Intaglio for Printmaking Majors, and a class in Direct, Non-Toxic Intaglio Printmaking. She has also taught intaglio and woodcut courses for several years at the State University of New York at New Paltz and, in winter 2002 term, a course on Print Connoisseurship in New York University's School of Continuing Education.

In 2002, Wax moved to Peekskill, New York, to take advantage of the city's downtown revitalization program that gave artists the chance to purchase live/work spaces, known as "The Art Lofts," with minimal down payments.

An Artist's Fellowship Grant in 2003 from the New York Foundation for the Arts and a Concordia Career Advancement Award the following year enabled Wax to acquire and refurbish a secondhand etching press that was large enough and powerful enough to accommodate her bigger plates. This equipment allowed Wax to free herself of dependence on contract printers and to create large-scale color mezzotint engravings using multiple plates and incorporating a host of related techniques such as stipple, drypoint, and burin engraving.

Carol Wax, Catalogue Raisonné/Prints, 1975–2005 (Herakleidon Art Museum, 2006)

In 2006, the Herakleidon Art Museum in Athens, Greece, presented a solo show of her work. Titled "Shadowplay," it included every edition Wax had published, including her early lithographs along with many state proofs, color separation proofs, plates, preparatory sketches, and related drawings and pastels. The Herakleidon also published Carol Wax, Catalogue Raisonné/Prints, 1975–2005 in 2006 to document her first thirty years as a printmaker. One reviewer noted that "The reader will readily be captivated by Wax's onomatomania and obsession with man-powered mechanical objects that click, clatter or ring like her signature typewriters and sewing machines." The Herakleidon mounted another exhibition of her work, "Dance of Shadows," in 2011.

Since January 2007, Wax has taught printmaking as an adjunct professor at New Jersey's Montclair State University. She also presents mezzotint workshops and lectures on her own work and on the history of mezzotint at arts organizations, universities, and museums. She has held visiting artist positions on numerous occasions and has presented dozens of mezzotint demonstrations and workshops, as well as slide lectures at universities, colleges, arts organizations, and museums throughout the United States.

In 2009, she received an Individual Support Grant from the Adolph and Esther Gottlieb Foundation.

In 2011, she served as Head Juror for awarding prizes at the First International Mezzotint Festival, Yekaterinburg Museum of Fine Arts, Yekaterinburg, Russia.

Wax's prints are held by many museum collections, including the Metropolitan Museum of Art, the National Museum of American Art, the Philadelphia Museum of Art, the Brooklyn Museum, and the Boston and New York Public Libraries.

Her prints are available through the Metropolitan Museum of Art's Mezzanine Gallery. Other galleries that represent her prints are Davidson Galleries in Seattle and Conrad Graeber Fine Arts in Baltimore.

She has described her work:

My images of commonplace objects reflect my personal experience of the ordinary as extraordinary. Most people rarely think about the "stuff" in our lives but, to me, even the most ordinary items seem magical. I often depict old instruments, mechanical devices, and fabric because their repetitive patterns create rhythms of light, shadow, and forms that can be manipulated to convey my phantasmagorical perceptions. The ability to achieve dramatic lighting effects through the mezzotint engraving process makes it the ideal medium for rendering my imagery.

Although my style may be categorized as representational in the nature morte tradition, to me, still-life does not mean dead weight. By portraying my subjects transcending their status as lifeless objects I strive to depict the anima in the inanimate.

== Newcomb Art Gallery, Tulane University ==
In 2013, Earl Retif and Ann Salzer donated a group of artworks to Tulane University to benefit its students. The gift included ten mezzotints by Carol Wax that were placed on special exhibition on the second floor of the Lavin-Bernick Center, where they have remained on continuous public view for the past ten years. The works are now part of the permanent collection of the Newcomb Art Gallery. The prints include Cirque du Sew Lace, Falling Water, Machina, Missing Link, Refractions, Remington Return, Singer II, Telefon, The Hollywood, and Time Lines.

== Selected writing ==
- "A Historical and Technical Perspective on the Mezzotints of Yozo Hamaguchi" for the exhibition catalog Yozo Hamaguchi: Master of Mezzotint (Tokyo Metropolitan Teien Art Museum, The Tokyo Culture Foundation, and the Mainichi Newspapers, Japan)
- "Singer II" in the exhibition catalog Mezzotints of Yesterday and Today (Stanford University Museum of Art, 1992)
- Review of Ellen D'Oench, "Copper Into Gold: Prints by John Raphael Smith", in Journal of the Print World, Fall 1999
- "From an Artist’s Point of View...", essay for the exhibition catalog titled New York Society of Etchers at the National Arts Club (2000)
- "Breathing Life Into Dead Weight," Virtual Typewriter Journal, June 2005
- "Carol Wax On The Black Manner," on the WorldPrintmakers website
- "Ars Ex Machina," Artist's Magazine, November 2007
- "A Conversation with Frederick Mershimer," in Frederick Mershimer: Mezzotints 1984–2006 (2007)
- "Juror's Statement" for the exhibition catalogue. International Mezzotint Festival, Ekaterinburg, Russia,
- "Erasing to Remember", essay for a catalogue of mezzotints by Eduardo Fausti, 2011
- Mezzotint, Art of Darkness, an exhibition of classical and contemporary mezzotints organized by Carol Wax and Earl Retif for the New Orleans Museum of Art, April 27 – July 28, 1996
