= Jean-Yves Bosseur =

French composer and writer

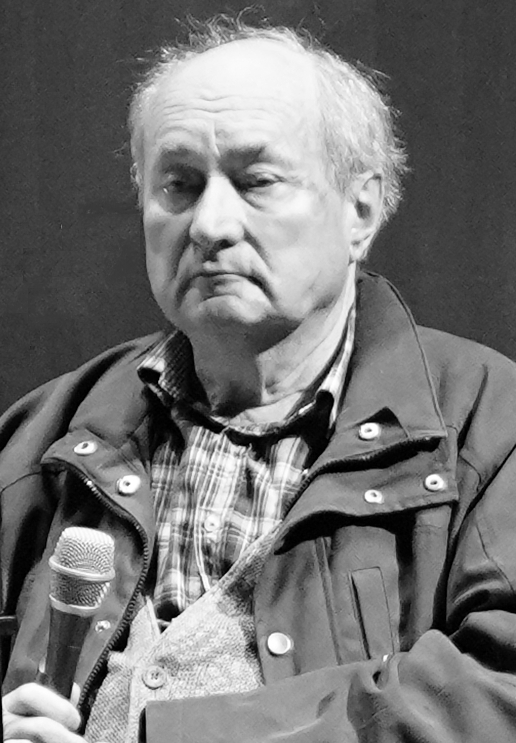

Jean-Yves Bosseur (born in Paris, 5 February 1947) is a French composer and writer.

Bosseur studied composition with Henri Pousseur and Karlheinz Stockhausen at the Third, Fourth, and Fifth Cologne Courses for New Music, from 1965 to 1968, at the Hochschule für Musik Köln, and received a doctorate in aesthetic philosophy from the University of Paris. He has composed more than 200 works and is most noteworthy for his stage works and chamber music.

In his appreciation to the transversality of Music and art, Bosseur writes about Zad Moultaka in his book as a particular artist who is at multiple crossroads: his orientale culture to the western culture, to music and visual arts without systématisme which makes his production profoundly anchored in archetype and myths and adds a sense of sacred to his works.

== Bibliography ==
- Bosseur, Jean-Yves. 1998. Vocabulaire des arts plastiques du XXe siècle. Paris: Minerve. ISBN 2-86931-065-X.
- Bosseur, Jean-Yves. 2013. Compositeur parmi les peintres. Collection Musique/Transversales. Sampzon: Editions Delatour France. ISBN 9782752101433.
- Bosseur, Jean-Yves. 2025. Zad Moultaka : Strates et palimpsestes. Collection Musiques/ Transversales. Editions Delatour France. ISBN 9782752105028
