= Ellen D'Oench =

American art historian and curator

Ellen Gates D'Oench

Ellen D'Oench (née Gates; October 2, 1930 – May 22, 2009) was Curator Emerita of the Davison Art Center at Wesleyan University, Connecticut. A Wesleyan graduate magna cum laude, she taught courses on museum studies, the history of prints, and the history of photographs. She curated the Davison Art Center from 1979 until 1998.

== Biography ==
Ellen Gates attended Miss Porter's School in Farmington, Connecticut and later, Vassar College, graduating from Wesleyan. She became an expert on the art of Arthur Devis on whom she completed her PhD dissertation at Yale University under the title "Arthur Devis: Master of the Georgian Conversation Piece". In 2011, an exhibition was held at the Davison Art Center titled "Collecting Photographs: Ellen G. D'Oench and the Growth of the Collection". She wrote about and catalogued the work of Robert F. Sheehan's color photography.

== Marriage ==
In 1949, Ellen Gates married Russell Grace D'Oench Jr. (1927-2002), a great-great-grandson of businessman W. R. Grace. The couple had four children, one of whom, Jennifer, predeceased her parents.

== Selected publications ==
- The conversation piece: Arthur Devis and his contemporaries. Yale University Press, New Haven, 1980. ISBN 0930606280
- Copper into gold: Prints by John Raphael Smith. Yale University Press, New Haven, 1999. ISBN 9780300076301
- "Arthur Devis" in Oxford Dictionary of National Biography, Oxford University Press, Oxford.
